This is a list of Acts of the Oireachtas (Irish parliament) for the years 1922 to present.

Notes
In the lists below, unless otherwise stated, all Acts are public Acts.

Prior to 2003, the short title of legislation included a comma before the year, i.e., Appropriation Act, 1922. This is omitted in accordance with the Interpretation Act 2005.

1922–1929

1922
No. 1/1922 – Constitution of the Irish Free State (Saorstát Éireann) Act 1922
An Act of the Irish Constituent Assembly as the Oireachtas did not yet exist.
No. 2/1922 – Adaptation of Enactments Act 1922
No. 3/1922 – Appropriation Act 1922
No. 4/1922 – Local Elections Postponement Act 1922
No. 5/1922 – Expiring Laws Continuance Act 1922

1923
No. 1/1923 – Comptroller and Auditor-General Act 1923
No. 2/1923 – Indemnity (British Military) Act 1923
No. 3/1923 – Statutory Undertakings (Continuance of Charges) Act 1923
No. 4/1923 – Enforcement of Law (Occasional Powers) Act 1923
No. 5/1923 – Griffith Settlement Act 1923
No. 6/1923 – District Justices (Temporary Provisions) Act 1923
No. 7/1923 – Central Fund (No. 1) Act 1923
No. 8/1923 – Double Taxation (Relief) Act 1923
No. 9/1923 – Local Government (Temporary Provisions) Act 1923
No. 10/1923 – Solicitors (Ireland) Act 1898, Amendment Act 1923
No. 11/1923 – Local Authorities (Extension of Time) Act 1923
No. 12/1923 – Electoral Act 1923
No. 13/1923 – Summer Time Act 1923
No. 14/1923 – Governor-General's Salary and Establishment Act 1923
No. 15/1923 – Damage To Property (Compensation) Act 1923
No. 16/1923 – Statutory Undertakings (Continuance of Charges) (No. 2) Act 1923
No. 17/1923 – Unemployment Insurance Act 1923
No. 18/1923 – The Oireachtas (Payment of Members) Act 1923
No. 19/1923 – Increase of Rent and Mortgage Interest (Restrictions) Act 1923
No. 20/1923 – National Health Insurance Act 1923
No. 21/1923 – Finance Act 1923
No. 22/1923 – Rathdown No. 1 Waterworks Provisional Order (Confirmation) Act 1923
No. 23/1923 – Censorship of Films Act 1923
No. 24/1923 – Civic Guard (Acquisition of Premises) Act 1923
No. 25/1923 – Land Trust Powers Act 1923
No. 26/1923 – Army Pensions Act 1923
No. 27/1923 – Land Law (Commission) Act 1923
No. 28/1923 – Public Safety (Emergency Powers) Act 1923
No. 29/1923 – Public Safety (Emergency Powers) (No. 2) Act 1923
No. 30/1923 – Defence Forces (Temporary Provisions) Act 1923
No. 31/1923 – Indemnity Act 1923
No. 32/1923 – Finance (No. 2) Act 1923
No. 33/1923 – Appropriation Act 1923
No. 34/1923 – Superannuation and Pensions Act 1923
No. 35/1923 – Civil Service Regulation Act 1923
No. 36/1923 – Dáil Éireann Courts (Winding-Up) Act 1923
No. 37/1923 – Garda Síochána (Temporary Provisions) Act 1923
No. 38/1923 – The Prevention of Electoral Abuses Act 1923
No. 39/1923 – Dyestuffs (Import Regulation) Repeal Act 1923
No. 40/1923 – Valuation (Postponement of Revision) Act 1923
No. 41/1923 – League of Nations (Guarantee) Act 1923
No. 42/1923 – Land Act 1923
No. 43/1923 – Damage To Property (Amendment) Act 1923
No. 44/1923 – Licensing (Renewal of Licences) Act 1923
No. 45/1923 – County Courts (Amendment) Act 1923
No. 46/1923 – Interpretation Act 1923
No. 47/1923 – Expiring Laws Act 1923
No. 48/1923 – Local Elections Postponement (Amendment) Act 1923
No. 49/1923 – Local Authorities (Indemnity) Act 1923
No. 50/1923 – Gaming Act 1923

1924
No. 1/1924 – Public Safety (Powers of Arrest and Detention) Temporary Act 1924
No. 2/1924 – Court Officers (Temporary Appointments) Act 1924
No. 3/1924 – Dáil Éireann Loans and Funds Act 1924
No. 4/1924 – Coroners (Qualification) Act 1924
No. 5/1924 – Civil Service Regulation Act 1924
No. 6/1924 – Fisheries Act 1924
No. 7/1924 – Local Government Electors Registration Act 1924
No. 8/1924 – Central Fund Act 1924
No. 9/1924 – Firearms (Temporary Provisions) Act 1924
No. 10/1924 – Courts of Justice Act 1924
No. 11/1924 – Local Government (Collection of Rates) Act 1924
No. 12/1924 – Summer Time Act 1924
No. 13/1924 – Local Government (Temporary Provisions) (Amendment) Act 1924
No. 14/1924 – Housing (Building Facilities) Act 1924
No. 15/1924 – Public Safety (Punishment of Offences) Temporary Act 1924
No. 16/1924 – Ministers and Secretaries Act 1924
No. 17/1924 – Electricity Undertakings (Continuance of Charges) Act 1924
No. 18/1924 – Juries (Amendment) Act 1924
No. 19/1924 – Old Age Pension Act 1924
No. 20/1924 – Enforcement of Law (Occasional Powers) Act 1924
No. 21/1924 – Companies (Re-Constitution of Records) Act 1924
No. 22/1924 – Road Fund (Advances) Act 1924
No. 23/1924 – Civic Guard (Acquisition of Premises) (Amendment) Act 1924
No. 24/1924 – Dublin Reconstruction (Emergency Provisions) Act 1924
No. 25/1924 – The Garda Síochána Act 1924
No. 26/1924 – Unemployment Insurance Act 1924
No. 27/1924 – Finance Act 1924
No. 28/1924 – Intoxicating Liquor Act 1924
No. 29/1924 – Railways Act 1924
No. 30/1924 – National Health Insurance Act 1924
No. 31/1924 – Dublin Police Act 1924
No. 32/1924 – Dáil Éireann Courts (Winding Up) Act 1923, Amendment Act 1924
No. 33/1924 – Telephone Capital Act 1924
No. 34/1924 – Appropriation Act 1924
No. 35/1924 – Agricultural Produce (Eggs) Act 1924
No. 36/1924 – Local Government (Rates on Agricultural Land) Act 1924
No. 37/1924 – Criminal Justice (Evidence) Act 1924
No. 38/1924 – Defence Forces (Temporary Provisions) Act 1923 (Continuance and Amendment) Act 1924
No. 39/1924 – Local Elections Postponement (Amendment) Act 1924
No. 40/1924 – Indemnity Act 1924
No. 41/1924 – Trade Loans (Guarantee) Act 1924
No. 42/1924 – Damage To Property (Compensation) (Amendment) Act 1924
No. 43/1924 – Fisheries (Election of Conservators Postponement) Act 1924
No. 44/1924 – Criminal Justice (Administration) Act 1924
No. 45/1924 – State Lands Act 1924
No. 46/1924 – Drainage Maintenance Act 1924
No. 47/1924 – Intermediate Education (Amendment) Act 1924
No. 48/1924 – Military Service Pensions Act 1924
No. 49/1924 – State Harbours Act 1924
No. 50/1924 – Local Officers' Compensation (War Period) Act 1924
No. 51/1924 – Treaty (Confirmation of Supplemental Agreement) Act 1924
No. 52/1924 – Private Bill Costs Act 1924
No. 53/1924 – Oireachtas Witnesses Oaths Act 1924
No. 54/1924 – Housing (Building Facilities) (Amendment) Act 1924
No. 55/1924 – Seed Supply Act 1924
No. 56/1924 – Public Holidays Act 1924
No. 57/1924 – County Court Appeals Act 1924
No. 58/1924 – Dairy Produce Act 1924
No. 59/1924 – Unemployment Insurance (No. 2) Act 1924
No. 60/1924 – Expiring Laws Act 1924
No. 61/1924 – Railways (Directorate) Act 1924
No. 62/1924 – Intoxicating Liquor (General) Act 1924

Private Acts
No. 1/1924 – The Sligo Lighting and Electric Power Act 1924
No. 2/1924 – Pilotage Orders Confirmation Act 1924

1925
No. 1/1925 – Dublin Port and Docks Act 1925
No. 2/1925 – Medical Act 1925
No. 3/1925 – Live Stock Breeding Act 1925
No. 4/1925 – Defence Forces (Temporary Provisions) Act 1925
No. 5/1925 – Local Government Act 1925
No. 6/1925 – Central Fund Act 1925
No. 7/1925 – Police Forces Amalgamation Act 1925
No. 8/1925 – Summer Time Act 1925
No. 9/1925 – Dáil Éireann Courts (Winding-Up) Act 1925
No. 10/1925 – Firearms (Temporary Provisions) (Continuance) Act 1925
No. 11/1925 – Prisons (Visiting Committees) Act 1925
No. 12/1925 – Housing Act 1925
No. 13/1925 – Dáil Supreme Court (Pensions) Act 1925
No. 14/1925 – Civic Guard (Acquisition of Premises) (Amendment) Act 1925
No. 15/1925 – Military Service Pensions Act 1925
No. 16/1925 – Enforcement of Law (Occasional Powers) (Continuance) Act 1925
No. 17/1925 – Firearms Act 1925
No. 18/1925 – Treasonable Offences Act 1925
No. 19/1925 – Trade Loans (Guarantee) (Amendment) Act 1925
No. 20/1925 – Local Authorities (Combined Purchasing) Act 1925
No. 21/1925 – Censorship of Films (Amendment) Act 1925
No. 22/1925 – Acquisition of Land (Reference Committee) Act 1925
No. 23/1925 – Superannuation and Pensions (Amendment) Act 1925
No. 24/1925 – Documentary Evidence Act 1925
No. 25/1925 – Land Bond Act 1925
No. 26/1925 – Shannon Electricity Act 1925
No. 27/1925 – Appropriation Act 1925
No. 28/1925 – Finance Act 1925
No. 29/1925 – Oireachtas (Payment of Members) (Amendment) Act 1925
No. 30/1925 – Constitution (Amendment No. 1) Act 1925
No. 31/1925 – Phoenix Park Act 1925
No. 32/1925 – Fisheries Act 1925
No. 33/1925 – Arterial Drainage Act 1925
No. 34/1925 – Electoral (Seanad Elections) Act 1925
No. 35/1925 – Local Government (Rates on Agricultural Land) Act 1925
No. 36/1925 – National Health Insurance Act 1925
No. 37/1925 – Beet Sugar (Subsidy) Act 1925
No. 38/1925 – Dublin Reconstruction (Emergency Provisions) (Amendment) Act 1925
No. 39/1925 – Shop Hours (Drapery Trades, Dublin and Districts) Act 1925
No. 40/1925 – Treaty (Confirmation of Amending Agreement) Act 1925
No. 41/1925 – Expiring Laws Act 1925
No. 42/1925 – Local Elections Postponement Act 1925

Private Acts
No. 1/1925 — Dublin United Tramways (Omnibus Services) Act 1925
No. 2/1925 — Department of Local Government and Public Health Provisional Order Confirmation No. 1 Act 1925
No. 3/1925 — Dundalk Harbour and Port Act 1925

1926
No. 1/1926 – Courts of Justice Act 1926
No. 2/1926 – Electricity Supply (Special Powers) Act 1926
No. 3/1926 – River Owenmore Drainage Act 1926
No. 4/1926 – Medical Act 1926
No. 5/1926 – Oil in Navigable Waters Act 1926
No. 6/1926 – Adaptation of Charters Act 1926
No. 7/1926 – Industrial Trust Company of Ireland Limited (Acquisition of Capital) Act 1926
No. 8/1926 – Acquisition of Land (Allotments) Act 1926
No. 9/1926 – Defence Forces (Temporary Provisions) Act 1926
No. 10/1926 – Police Forces Amalgamation (Amendment) Act 1926
No. 11/1926 – Land Act 1926
No. 12/1926 – Statistics Act 1926
No. 13/1926 – Central Fund Act 1926
No. 14/1926 – Coinage Act 1926
No. 15/1926 – Street Trading Act 1926
No. 16/1926 – The Protection of the Community (Special Powers) Act 1926
No. 17/1926 – School Attendance Act 1926
No. 18/1926 – Enforcement of Court Orders Act 1926
No. 19/1926 – Damage To Property (Compensation) (Amendment) Act 1926
No. 20/1926 – Civic Guard (Acquisition of Premises) (Amendment) Act 1926
No. 21/1926 – Unemployment Insurance Act 1926
No. 22/1926 – Local Elections (Dissolved Authorities) Act 1926
No. 23/1926 – Deputy Registrar in Bankruptcy (Cork) Act 1926
No. 24/1926 – Increase of Rent and Mortgage Interest (Restrictions) Act 1926
No. 25/1926 – Railways (Existing Officers and Servants) Act 1926
No. 26/1926 – Immature Spirits (Restriction) Act 1926
No. 27/1926 – Court Officers Act 1926
No. 28/1926 – Appropriation Act 1926
No. 29/1926 – Road Fund (Advances) Act 1926
No. 30/1926 – Local Government (Collection of Rates) Act 1926
No. 31/1926 – Housing Act 1926
No. 32/1926 – University Education (Agriculture and Dairy Science) Act 1926 
No. 33/1926 – Trade Loans (Guarantee) (Amendment) Act 1926
No. 34/1926 – Local Authorities (Mutual Assurance) Act 1926
No. 35/1926 – Finance Act 1926
No. 36/1926 – Shop Hours (Drapery Trades, Dublin and Districts) Act 1926
No. 37/1926 – Juries (Dublin) Act 1926
No. 38/1926 – Betting Act 1926
No. 39/1926 – Local Authorities (Officers and Employees) Act 1926
No. 40/1926 – Tariff Commission Act 1926
No. 41/1926 – Civil Service Regulation (Amendment) Act 1926
No. 42/1926 – Public Safety (Emergency Powers) Act 1926
No. 43/1926 – Expiring Laws Act 1926
No. 44/1926 – National Health Insurance Act 1926
No. 45/1926 – Wireless Telegraphy Act 1926

Private Acts
No. 1/1926 – Pilotage Order Confirmation Act 1926
No. 2/1926 – Limerick Harbour Act 1926

1927
No. 1/1927 – Coroners (Amendment) Act 1927
No. 2/1927 – Medical Act 1927
No. 3/1927 – Local Government Act 1927
No. 4/1927 – Constitution (Amendment No. 3) Act 1927
No. 5/1927 – Constitution (Amendment No. 4) Act 1927
No. 6/1927 – Constitution (Amendment No. 2) Act 1927
No. 7/1927 – Provisional Collection of Taxes Act 1927
No. 8/1927 – Telephone Capital Act 1927
No. 9/1927 – Defence Forces (Temporary Provisions) Act 1927
No. 10/1927 – Circuit Court Appeals Act 1927
No. 11/1927 – Central Fund Act 1927
No. 12/1927 – Army Pensions Act 1927
No. 13/1927 – Constitution (Amendment No. 5) Act 1927
No. 14/1927 – Local Elections (Dissolved Authorities) Act 1927
No. 15/1927 – Intoxicating Liquor Act 1927
No. 16/1927 – Industrial and Commercial Property (Protection) Act 1927
No. 17/1927 – Railways (Road Motor Services) Act 1927
No. 18/1927 – Finance Act 1927
No. 19/1927 – Land Act 1927
No. 20/1927 – Appropriation Act 1927
No. 21/1927 – Electoral (Amendment) Act 1927
No. 22/1927 – Civic Guard (Acquisition of Premises) (Amendment) Act 1927
No. 23/1927 – Juries Act 1927
No. 24/1927 – Agricultural Credit Act 1927
No. 25/1927 – Medical Practitioners Act 1927
No. 26/1927 – Barrow Drainage Act 1927
No. 27/1927 – Electricity (Supply) Act 1927
No. 28/1927 – Appropriation (No 2) Act 1927
No. 29/1927 – Courts of Justice Act 1927
No. 30/1927 – Trade Loans (Guarantee) (Amendment) Act 1927
No. 31/1927 – Public Safety Act 1927
No. 32/1927 – Currency Act 1927
No. 33/1927 – Electoral (Amendment) (No. 2) Act 1927
No. 34/1927 – County Court Appeals Act 1927
No. 35/1927 – Dairy Produce (Amendment) Act 1927
No. 36/1927 – Expiring Laws Act 1927
No. 37/1927 – National Health Insurance Act 1927
No. 38/1927 – Finance (No. 2) Act 1927
No. 39/1927 – Local Elections Act 1927
No. 40/1927 – Defence Forces (Temporary Provisions) (No. 2) Act 1927

Private Acts
No. 1/1927 – Pilotage Order Confirmation Act 1927
No. 2/1927 – Dublin United Tramways (Lucan Electric Railways) Act 1927

1928
No. 1/1928 – Old Age Pensions Act 1928
No. 2/1928 – Central Fund Act 1928
No. 3/1928 – Weights and Measures Act 1928
No. 4/1928 – Local Government (Rates on Small Dwellings) Act 1928
No. 5/1928 – Increase of Rent and Mortgage Interest (Restrictions) Act 1928
No. 6/1928 – Ministers and Secretaries (Amendment) Act 1928
No. 7/1928 – Civic Guard (Acquisition of Premises) (Amendment) Act 1928
No. 8/1928 – Constitution (Amendment No. 10) Act 1928
No. 9/1928 – Bodies Corporate (Executors and Administrators) Act 1928
No. 10/1928 – Telegraph Act 1928
No. 11/1928 – Finance Act 1928
No. 12/1928 – Slaughtered Animals (Compensation) Act 1928
No. 13/1928 – Constitution (Amendment No. 6) Act 1928
No. 14/1928 – Constitution (Amendment No. 13) Act 1928
No. 15/1928 – Courts of Justice Act 1928
No. 16/1928 – Central Fund (No. 2) Act 1928
No. 17/1928 – Oireachtas (Payment of Members) Act 1928
No. 18/1928 – Betting Act 1928
No. 19/1928 – Trade Loans (Guarantee) (Amendment) Act 1928
No. 20/1928 – National Gallery of Ireland Act 1928
No. 21/1928 – Local Authorities (Mutual Assurance) Act 1928
No. 22/1928 – Agricultural Credit Act 1928
No. 23/1928 – Arterial Drainage (Minor Schemes) Act 1928
No. 24/1928 – Gas Regulation Act 1928
No. 25/1928 – Dentists Act 1928
No. 26/1928 – Creamery Act 1928
No. 27/1928 – Constitution (Amendment No. 8) Act 1928
No. 28/1928 – Constitution (Amendment No. 9) Act 1928
No. 29/1928 – Seanad Electoral Act 1928
No. 30/1928 – Constitution (Amendment No. 7) Act 1928
No. 31/1928 – Housing Act 1928
No. 32/1928 – Teachers Superannuation Act 1928
No. 33/1928 – Appropriation Act 1928
No. 34/1928 – Forestry Act 1928
No. 35/1928 – Courts of Justice (No, 2) Act 1928
No. 36/1928 – Expiring Laws Act 1928
No. 37/1928 – National Health Insurance Act 1928
No. 38/1928 – Public Safety Act 1928

Private Acts
No. 1/1928 – Pilotage Order Confirmation Act 1928
No. 2/1928 – The Methodist Church in Ireland Act 1928
No. 3/1928 – Local Government and Public Health Provisional Order Confirmation Act 1928

1929
No. 1/1929 – Cork City Management Act 1929
No. 2/1929 – Defence Forces (Temporary Provisions) Act 1929
No. 3/1929 – Local Elections (Dublin) Act 1929
No. 4/1929 – Central Fund Act 1929
No. 5/1929 – Finance (Customs and Stamp Duties) Act 1929
No. 6/1929 – Ennis Urban District Council (Dissolution) Act 1929
No. 7/1929 – Destructive Insects and Pests Act 1929
No. 8/1929 – Constitution (Amendment No. 14) Act 1929
No. 9/1929 – Constitution (Amendment No. 15) Act 1929
No. 10/1929 – Constitution (Amendment No. 16) Act 1929
No. 11/1929 – Superannuation and Pensions Act 1929
No. 12/1929 – Housing Act 1929
No. 13/1929 – Industrial and Commercial Property (Protection) (Amendment) Act 1929
No. 14/1929 – Intoxicating Liquor (Amendment) Act 1929
No. 15/1929 – Increase of Rent and Mortgage Interest (Restrictions) Act 1929
No. 16/1929 – Legal Practitioners (Qualification) Act 1929
No. 17/1929 – Betting Act 1929
No. 18/1929 – Arterial Drainage (Amendment) Act 1929
No. 19/1929 – Civic Guard (Acquisition of Premises) (Amendment) Act 1929
No. 20/1929 – Intoxicating Liquor (Amendment) (No. 2) Act 1929
No. 21/1929 – Censorship of Publications Act 1929
No. 22/1929 – Totalisator Act 1929
No. 23/1929 – Railways (Amendment) Act 1929
No. 24/1929 – Children Act 1929
No. 25/1929 – Copyright (Preservation) Act 1929
No. 26/1929 – Electricity (Finance) Act 1929
No. 27/1929 – Trade Loans (Guarantee) (Amendment) Act 1929
No. 28/1929 – Trim Urban District Council (Dissolution) Act 1929
No. 29/1929 – Appropriation Act 1929
No. 30/1929 – Agricultural Credit Act 1929
No. 31/1929 – Land Act 1929
No. 32/1929 – Finance Act 1929
No. 33/1929 – Juries (Protection) Act 1929
No. 34/1929 – Constitution (Amendment No. 11) Act 1929
No. 35/1929 – University College Galway Act 1929
No. 36/1929 – Civil Service (Transferred Officers) Compensation Act 1929
No. 37/1929 – Courts of Justice Act 1929
No. 38/1929 – Expiring Laws Act 1929
No. 39/1929 – Electricity Agreements (Adaptation) Act 1929
No. 40/1929 – Poor Relief (Dublin) Act 1929
No. 41/1929 – An tAcht na dTithe (Gaeltacht) 1929
No. 41/1929 – Housing (Gaeltacht) Act 1929
No. 42/1929 – National Health Insurance Act 1929

Private Acts
No. 1/1929 – Limerick Corporation Gas Undertaking (Pensions) Act 1929
No. 2/1929 – Dublin Port and Docks (Bridges) Act 1929
No. 3/1929 – Pier and Harbour Provisional Order Confirmation Act 1929
No. 4/1929 – Bank of Ireland Act 1929

1930–1939

1930
No. 1/1930 – Seanad Bye-Elections Act 1930
No. 2/1930 – National Monuments Act 1930
No. 3/1930 – University Education (Agriculture and Dairy Science) Act 1930
No. 4/1930 – Finance (New Customs Duties) Act 1930
No. 5/1930 – Constitution (Amendment No. 12) Act 1930
No. 6/1930 – Defence Forces (Temporary Provisions) Act 1930
No. 7/1930 – Central Fund Act 1930
No. 8/1930 – Military Service Pensions Act 1930
No. 9/1930 – State Lands (Workhouses) Act 1930
No. 10/1930 – Agricultural Produce (Fresh Meat) Act 1930
No. 11/1930 – Game Preservation Act 1930
No. 12/1930 – Public Charitable Hospitals (Temporary Provisions) Act 1930
No. 13/1930 – Censorship of Films (Amendment) Act 1930
No. 14/1930 – Civil Service (Transferred Officers) Compensation (Amendment) Act 1930
No. 15/1930 – Civic Guard (Acquisition of Premises) (Amendment) Act 1930
No. 16/1930 – Wild Birds Protection Act 1930
No. 17/1930 – Illegitimate Children (Affiliation Orders) Act 1930
No. 18/1930 – Increase of Rent and Mortgage Interest (Restrictions) Act 1930
No. 19/1930 – Electricity (Supply) (Amendment) Act 1930
No. 20/1930 – Finance Act 1930
No. 21/1930 – Appropriation Act 1930
No. 22/1930 – Housing Act 1930
No. 23/1930 – School Meals (Gaeltacht) Act 1930
No. 24/1930 – Trade Loans (Guarantee) (Amendment) Act 1930
No. 25/1930 – Labourers Act 1930
No. 26/1930 – Local Government (Amendment) Act 1930
No. 27/1930 – Local Government (Dublin) Act 1930
No. 28/1930 – Electoral (Dublin Commercial) Act 1930
No. 29/1930 – Vocational Education Act 1930
No. 30/1930 – Currency (Amendment) Act 1930
No. 31/1930 – Tariff Commission (Amendment) Act 1930
No. 32/1930 – Expiring Laws Act 1930
No. 33/1930 – Unemployment Insurance Act 1930
No. 34/1930 – Education (Provision of Meals) (Amendment) Act 1930
No. 35/1930 – Portuguese Treaty Act 1930
No. 36/1930 – Agricultural Produce (Eggs) Act 1930

Private Acts
No. 1/1930 – Waterford and Bishop Foy Endowed Schools (Amendment) Act 1930
No. 2/1930 – Pier and Harbour Provisional Order Confirmation Act 1930

1931
No. 1/1931 – Courts of Justice Act 1931
No. 2/1931 – Defence Forces (Temporary Provisions) Act 1931
No. 3/1931 – Public Health (Special Expenses) Act 1931
No. 4/1931 – Sea Fisheries Act 1931
No. 5/1931 – Central Fund Act 1931
No. 6/1931 – Aliens Restriction (Amendment) Act 1931
No. 7/1931 – Poor Relief (Dublin) Act 1931
No. 8/1931 – Agriculture Act 1931
No. 9/1931 – Commissioners For Oaths (Diplomatic and Consular) Act 1931
No. 10/1931 – Plate Assay (Amendment) Act 1931
No. 11/1931 – Land Act 1931
No. 12/1931 – Telephone Capital Act 1931
No. 13/1931 – Legitimacy Act 1931
No. 14/1931 – Finance (Customs Duties) Act 1931
No. 15/1931 – Tourist Traffic (Development) Act 1931
No. 16/1931 – Civic Guard (Acquisition of Premises) (Amendment) Act 1931
No. 17/1931 – Local Elections and Meetings (Postponement) Act 1931
No. 18/1931 – Juries (Protection) Act 1931
No. 19/1931 – Local Government Act 1931
No. 20/1931 – Trustee Act 1931
No. 21/1931 – Trade Loans (Guarantee) (Amendment) Act 1931
No. 22/1931 – Pharmacopoeia Act 1931
No. 23/1931 – Railway Fires (Amendment) Act 1931
No. 24/1931 – Public Charitable Hospitals (Amendment) Act 1931
No. 25/1931 – Local Government (Dublin) (Amendment) Act 1931
No. 26/1931 – Agricultural Produce (Potatoes) Act 1931
No. 27/1931 – Betting Act 1931
No. 28/1931 – Local Government (Rates on Agricultural Land) Act 1931
No. 29/1931 – Dairy Produce Act 1931
No. 30/1931 – Appropriation Act 1931
No. 31/1931 – Finance Act 1931
No. 32/1931 – Electricity (Supply) (Amendment) Act 1931
No. 33/1931 – Fisheries (Revision of Loans) Act 1931
No. 34/1931 – Adaptation of Enactments Act 1931
No. 35/1931 – Midwives Act 1931
No. 36/1931 – Veterinary Surgeons Act 1931
No. 37/1931 – Constitution (Amendment No. 17) Act 1931
No. 38/1931 – Customs Duties (Provisional Imposition) Act 1931
No. 39/1931 – Finance (Customs Duties) (No. 2) Act 1931
No. 40/1931 – Courts of Justice (No. 2) Act 1931
No. 41/1931 – Finance (Increase of Income Tax) Act 1931
No. 42/1931 – Finance (Customs Duties) (No. 3) Act 1931
No. 43/1931 – Finance (Customs Duties) (No. 4) Act 1931
No. 44/1931 – Expiring Laws Act 1931
No. 45/1931 – Agricultural Produce (Fresh Meat) Act 1931
No. 46/1931 – Unemployment Relief Act 1931
No. 47/1931 – Railways (Valuation For Rating) Act 1931
No. 48/1931 – Merchandise Marks Act 1931
No. 49/1931 – Public Charitable Hospitals (Amendment) (No. 2) Act 1931
No. 50/1931 – Housing (Miscellaneous Provisions) Act 1931
No. 51/1931 – Public Charitable Hospitals (Amendment) (No. 3) Act 1931
No. 52/1931 – Defence Forces (Temporary Provisions) (No. 2) Act 1931
No. 53/1931 – Housing (Gaeltacht) (Amendment) Act 1931
No. 54/1931 – Mines and Minerals Act 1931
No. 55/1931 – Landlord and Tenant Act 1931
No. 56/1931 – Apprenticeship Act 1931

Private Acts
No. 1/1931 – Limerick Harbour Tramways Act 1931

1932
No. 1/1932 – Pension Books (Prohibition of Alienation) Act 1932
No. 2/1932 – Road Transport Act 1932
No. 3/1932 – Railways (Miscellaneous) Act 1932
No. 4/1932 – Central Fund Act 1932
No. 5/1932 – Finance (Customs Duties) Act 1932
No. 6/1932 – Intoxicating Liquor (Occasional Licences) Act 1932
No. 7/1932 – Eucharistic Congress (Miscellaneous Provisions) Act 1932
No. 8/1932 – Public Charitable Hospitals Amendment Act 1932
No. 9/1932 – Detained Animals (Compensation) Act 1932
No. 10/1932 – Dairy Produce (Price Stabilisation) Act 1932
No. 11/1932 – Finance (Customs Duties) (No. 2) Act 1932
No. 12/1932 – Trade Loans (Guarantee) (Amendment) Act 1932
No. 13/1932 – Dublin and Blessington Steam Tramway (Abandonment) Act 1932
No. 14/1932 – Diseases of Animals Act 1932
No. 15/1932 – Electricity (Supply) (Amendment) Act 1932
No. 16/1932 – Emergency Imposition of Duties Act 1932
No. 17/1932 – Central Fund (No. 2) Act 1932
No. 18/1932 – Old Age Pensions Act 1932
No. 19/1932 – Housing (Financial and Miscellaneous Provisions) Act 1932
No. 20/1932 – Finance Act 1932
No. 21/1932 – Control of Manufactures Act 1932
No. 22/1932 – Finance (Customs Duties) (No. 3) Act 1932
No. 23/1932 – Appropriation Act 1932
No. 24/1932 – Army Pensions Act 1932
No. 25/1932 – Therapeutic Substances Act 1932
No. 26/1932 – Defence Forces (Pensions) Act 1932
No. 27/1932 – Expiring Laws Act 1932
No. 28/1932 – Rates on Agricultural Land (Relief) Act 1932
No. 29/1932 – Electoral (Registration Appeals) Act 1932
No. 30/1932 – Seeds and Fertilisers Supply Act 1932
No. 31/1932 – Bourn Vincent Memorial Park Act 1932
No. 32/1932 – Merchant Shipping (Helm Orders) Act 1932
No. 33/1932 – Control of Prices Act 1932
No. 34/1932 – Finance (Customs Duties) (No. 4) Act 1932

Private Acts
No. 1/1932 – Pier and Harbour Provisional Order Confirmation Act 1932
No. 2/1932 – Pier and Harbour Provisional Order Confirmation (No. 2) Act 1932
No. 3/1932 – Pilotage Byelaw Confirmation Act 1932

1933
No. 1/1933 – Central Fund Act 1933
No. 2/1933 – Land (Purchase Annuities Fund) Act 1933
No. 3/1933 – Defence Forces (Temporary Provisions) Act 1933
No. 4/1933 – Dairy Produce (Price Stabilisation) Act 1933
No. 5/1933 – Local Government Act 1933
No. 6/1933 – Constitution (Removal of Oath) Act 1933
No. 7/1933 – Agricultural Produce (Cereals) Act 1933
No. 8/1933 – Road Transport Act 1933
No. 9/1933 – Railways Act 1933
No. 10/1933 – Trade Loans (Guarantee) (Amendment) Act 1933
No. 11/1933 – Road Traffic Act 1933
No. 12/1933 – Foreshore Act 1933
No. 13/1933 – National Health Insurance Act 1933
No. 14/1933 – Electoral (Amendment) Act 1933
No. 15/1933 – Finance Act 1933
No. 16/1933 – Musk Rats Act 1933
No. 17/1933 – Cement Act 1933
No. 18/1933 – Public Hospitals Act 1933
No. 19/1933 – Dáil Éireann Loans and Funds (Amendment) Act 1933
No. 20/1933 – Appropriation Act 1933
No. 21/1933 – Imposition of Duties (Confirmation of Orders) Act 1933
No. 22/1933 – Perpetual Funds (Registration) Act 1933
No. 23/1933 – Clare Castle Pier Act 1933
No. 24/1933 – Shannon Electricity (Amendment) Act 1933
No. 25/1933 – Industrial Credit Act 1933
No. 26/1933 – Agricultural Products (Regulation of Export) Act 1933
No. 27/1933 – Cork Tramways (Employees' Compensation) Act 1933
No. 28/1933 – Seeds and Fertilisers Supply Act 1933
No. 29/1933 – Merchant Shipping (International Labour Conventions) Act 1933
No. 30/1933 – Barrow Drainage Act 1933
No. 31/1933 – Sugar Manufacture Act 1933
No. 32/1933 – Garda Síochána (Pensions) Act 1933
No. 33/1933 – Land Bond Act 1933
No. 34/1933 – Approved Investments Act 1933
No. 35/1933 – Damage To Property (Compensation) (Amendment) Act 1933
No. 36/1933 – Moneylenders Act 1933
No. 37/1933 – Public Services (Temporary Economies) Act 1933
No. 38/1933 – Land Act 1933
No. 39/1933 – Road Transport (No. 2) Act 1933
No. 40/1933 – Constitution (Amendment No. 20) Act 1933
No. 41/1933 – Constitution (Amendment No. 21) Act 1933
No. 42/1933 – Merchant Shipping (Safety and Load Line Conventions) Act 1933
No. 43/1933 – Rates on Agricultural Land (Relief) Act 1933
No. 44/1933 – Unemployment Insurance Act 1933
No. 45/1933 – Constitution (Amendment No. 22) Act 1933
No. 46/1933 – Unemployment Assistance Act 1933
No. 47/1933 – Expiring Laws Act 1933
No. 48/1933 – School Meals (Gaeltacht) Act 1933
No. 49/1933 – Agricultural Produce (Cereals) (Amendment) Act 1933
No. 50/1933 – Oireachtas (Payment of Members) Act 1933
No. 51/1933 – Prisons Act 1933
No. 52/1933 – Finance (Customs and Excise Duties) Act 1933
No. 53/1933 – Sea Fisheries Protection Act 1933

Private Acts
No. 1/1933 – Cork Harbour Act 1933
No. 2/1933 – The Dublin General Cemetery Company's Act 1933
No. 3/1933 – Pier and Harbour Provisional Order Confirmation Act 1933

1934
No. 1/1934 – Dangerous Drugs Act 1934
No. 2/1934 – Harbours (Regulation of Rates) Act 1934
No. 3/1934 – Horse Breeding Act 1934
No. 4/1934 – Trade Loans (Guarantee) (Amendment) Act 1934
No. 5/1934 – Local Government (Amendment) Act 1934
No. 6/1934 – Electricity (Supply) (Amendment) Act 1934
No. 7/1934 – Acquisition of Land (Allotments) (Amendment) Act 1934
No. 8/1934 – Central Fund Act 1934
No. 9/1934 – Workmen's Compensation Act 1934
No. 10/1934 – Defence Forces (Temporary Provisions) Act 1934
No. 11/1934 – Land Bond Act 1934
No. 12/1934 – Control of Imports Act 1934
No. 13/1934 – Sheepskin (Control of Export) Act 1934
No. 14/1934 – Registration of Maternity Homes Act 1934
No. 15/1934 – Children Act 1934
No. 16/1934 – Local Services (Temporary Economies) Act 1934
No. 17/1934 – Road Transport Act 1934
No. 18/1934 – Finance (Customs Duties) Act 1934
No. 19/1934 – Customs Duties (Preferential Rates) Act 1934
No. 20/1934 – Agriculture (Amendment) Act 1934
No. 21/1934 – National Health Insurance Act 1934
No. 22/1934 – Town and Regional Planning Act 1934
No. 23/1934 – Public Assistance (Acquisition of Land) Act 1934
No. 24/1934 – Fisheries (Tidal Waters) Act 1934
No. 25/1934 – Poultry (Diseases) Act 1934
No. 26/1934 – Defence Forces (Temporary Provisions) (No. 2) Act 1934
No. 27/1934 – University College Dublin Act 1934
No. 28/1934 – Appropriation Act 1934
No. 29/1934 – Housing (Gaeltacht) (Amendment) Act 1934
No. 30/1934 – Housing (Financial and Miscellaneous Provisions) (Amendment) Act 1934
No. 31/1934 – Finance Act 1934
No. 32/1934 – Imposition of Duties (Confirmation of Orders) Act 1934
No. 33/1934 – Creamery (Amendment) Act 1934
No. 34/1934 – Dairy Produce (Amendment) Act 1934
No. 35/1934 – Limerick City Management Act 1934
No. 36/1934 – Control of Manufactures Act 1934
No. 37/1934 – Tobacco Act 1934
No. 38/1934 – Electricity (Supply) (Amendment) (No. 2) Act 1934
No. 39/1934 – Agricultural Co-Operative Societies (Debentures) Act 1934
No. 40/1934 – Industrial Alcohol Act 1934
No. 41/1934 – Agricultural Produce (Cereals) Act 1934
No. 42/1934 – Slaughter of Cattle and Sheep Act 1934
No. 43/1934 – Military Service Pensions Act 1934
No. 44/1934 – Local Government (Amendment) (No. 2) Act 1934
No. 45/1934 – Carriage by Sea (Heavy Articles) Act 1934
No. 46/1934 – Expiring Laws Act 1934
No. 47/1934 – Imposition of Duties (Confirmation of Orders) (No. 2) Act 1934

1935
No. 1/1935 – Rates on Agricultural Land (Relief) Act 1935
No. 2/1935 – Public Dance Halls Act 1935
No. 3/1935 – Sale of Food and Drugs (Milk) Act 1935
No. 4/1935 – Shannon Fisheries Act 1935
No. 5/1935 – Electoral (Revision of Constituencies) Act 1935
No. 6/1935 – Criminal Law Amendment Act 1935 (nicknamed the "Vice Act")
No. 7/1935 – Finance (Miscellaneous Provisions) Act 1935
No. 8/1935 – Central Fund Act 1935
No. 9/1935 – Local Government (Extension of Franchise) Act 1935
No. 10/1935 – Local Government (Dublin) Act 1935
No. 11/1935 – Defence Forces (Temporary Provisions) Act 1935
No. 12/1935 – Constitution (Amendment No. 26) Act 1935
No. 13/1935 – Irish Nationality and Citizenship Act 1935
No. 14/1935 – Aliens Act 1935
No. 15/1935 – Agricultural Products (Regulation of Export) (Amendment) Act 1935
No. 16/1935 – Local Loans Fund Act 1935
No. 17/1935 – Pounds (Provision and Maintenance) Act 1935
No. 18/1935 – Courthouses (Provision and Maintenance) Act 1935
No. 19/1935 – Local Government (Temporary Provisions) (Amendment) Act 1935
No. 20/1935 – Electricity (Supply) (Amendment) Act 1935
No. 21/1935 – Dairy Produce (Price Stabilisation) Act 1935
No. 22/1935 – Milk and Dairies Act 1935
No. 23/1935 – Road Transport Act 1935
No. 24/1935 – Pigs and Bacon Act 1935
No. 25/1935 – Appropriation Act 1935
No. 26/1935 – Agricultural Produce (Cereals) Act 1935
No. 27/1935 – Imposition of Duties (Confirmation of Orders) Act 1935
No. 28/1935 – Finance Act 1935
No. 29/1935 – Widows' and Orphans' Pensions Act 1935
No. 30/1935 – Rates on Agricultural Land (Relief) (No. 2) Act 1935
No. 31/1935 – Approved Investments (Amendment) Act 1935
No. 32/1935 – Diseases of Animals Act 1935
No. 33/1935 – Fisheries (Tidal Waters) (Amendment) Act 1935
No. 34/1935 – Fisheries Act 1935
No. 35/1935 – Trade Union Act 1935
No. 36/1935 – Agricultural Produce (Fresh Meat) (Amendment) Act 1935
No. 37/1935 – Slaughter of Cattle and Sheep (Amendment) Act 1935
No. 38/1935 – Unemployment Assistance (Amendment) Act 1935
No. 39/1935 – National Loan (Conversion) Act 1935
No. 40/1935 – League of Nations (Obligations of Membership) Act 1935
No. 41/1935 – Local Government (Dissolved Authorities) Act 1935
No. 42/1935 – Local Authorities (Mutual Assurance) Act 1935
No. 43/1935 – Railways Act 1935
No. 44/1935 – Cork Fever Hospital Act 1935
No. 45/1935 – Slaughter of Animals, Act 1935
No. 46/1935 – Expiring Laws Act 1935
No. 47/1935 – Imposition of Duties (Confirmation of Orders) (No. 2) Act 1935

Private Acts
No. 1/1935 – Bank of Ireland Act 1935
No. 2/1935 – Galway Harbour Act 1935
No. 3/1935 – Cork Milling Company Railway Act 1935

1936
No. 1/1936 – Land Purchase (Guarantee Fund) Act 1936
No. 2/1936 – Conditions of Employment Act 1936
No. 3/1936 – Defence Forces (Temporary Provisions) Act 1936
No. 4/1936 – Harbours, Docks and Piers (Charges) Act 1936
No. 5/1936 – School Attendance Act 1936
No. 6/1936 – Spanish Trade Agreement Act 1936
No. 7/1936 – Finance (Special Drawback) Act 1936
No. 8/1936 – Weights and Measures Act 1936
No. 9/1936 – Poor Relief (Dublin) Act 1936
No. 10/1936 – Imposition of Duties (Confirmation of Order) Act 1936
No. 11/1936 – Central Fund Act 1936
No. 12/1936 – National Health Insurance and Widows' and Orphans' Pensions Act 1936
No. 13/1936 – Housing (Financial and Miscellaneous Provisions) (Amendment) Act 1936
No. 14/1936 – Agricultural Seeds Act 1936
No. 15/1936 – Dáil Éireann Loans and Funds (Amendment) Act 1936
No. 16/1936 – Sugar (Control of Import) Act 1936
No. 17/1936 – Constitution (Amendment No. 23) Act 1936
No. 18/1936 – Constitution (Amendment No. 24) Act 1936
No. 19/1936 – Telephone Capital Act 1936
No. 20/1936 – Flax Act 1936
No. 21/1936 – Dublin Fever Hospital Act 1936
No. 22/1936 – Electoral (University Constituencies) Act 1936
No. 23/1936 – Turf (Use and Development) Act 1936
No. 24/1936 – Labourers Act 1936
No. 25/1936 – Rates on Agricultural Land (Relief) Act 1936
No. 26/1936 – Seanad Éireann (Consequential Provisions) Act 1936
No. 27/1936 – Housing (Financial and Miscellaneous Provisions) (Amendment) (No. 2) Act 1936
No. 28/1936 – Imposition of Duties (Confirmation of Order) (No. 2) Act 1936
No. 29/1936 – Bread (Regulation of Prices) Act 1936
No. 30/1936 – Agricultural Produce (Cereals) Act 1936
No. 31/1936 – Finance Act 1936
No. 32/1936 – Appropriation Act 1936
No. 33/1936 – Slaughter of Cattle and Sheep (Amendment) Act 1936
No. 34/1936 – Registration of Births and Deaths Act 1936
No. 35/1936 – Registration of Marriages Act 1936
No. 36/1936 – Aran Islands (Transport) Act 1936
No. 37/1936 – Connaught Rangers (Pensions) Act 1936
No. 38/1936 – Noxious Weeds Act 1936
No. 39/1936 – Superannuation Act 1936
No. 40/1936 – Air Navigation and Transport Act 1936
No. 41/1936 – Land Act 1936
No. 42/1936 – Night Work (Bakeries) Act 1936
No. 43/1936 – Milk (Regulation of Supply and Price) Act 1936
No. 44/1936 – Sale of Food and Drugs (Milk) Act 1936
No. 45/1936 – Insurance Act 1936
No. 46/1936 – Local Government Act 1936
No. 47/1936 – Marriages Act 1936
No. 48/1936 – Courts of Justice Act 1936
No. 49/1936 – Expiring Laws Act 1936
No. 50/1936 – Vocational Education (Amendment) Act 1936
No. 51/1936 – Registry of Friendly Societies Act 1936
No. 52/1936 – Imposition of Duties (Confirmation of Orders) (No. 3) Act 1936
No. 53/1936 – Agricultural Wages Act 1936
No. 54/1936 – Liffey Reservoir Act 1936
No. 55/1936 – Local Authorities (Miscellaneous Provisions) Act 1936
No. 56/1936 – Agricultural Produce (Cereals) (Amendment) Act 1936
No. 57/1936 – Constitution (Amendment No. 27) Act 1936
No. 58/1936 – Executive Authority (External Relations) Act 1936

Private Acts
No. 1/1936 – Poë Name and Arms (Compton Domvile Estates) Act 1936
No. 2/1936 – National Maternity Hospital, Dublin (Charter Amendment) Act 1936

1937
No. 1/1937 – Spanish Civil War (Non-Intervention) Act 1937
No. 2/1937 – Public Assistance Act 1937
No. 3/1937 – Circuit Court (Registration of Judgments) Act 1937
No. 4/1937 – Whale Fisheries Act 1937
No. 5/1937 – Garda Síochána Act 1937
No. 6/1937 – Defence Forces (Temporary Provisions) Act 1937
No. 7/1937 – Post Office (Evasion of Postage) Act 1937
No. 8/1937 – Control of Imports (Amendment) Act 1937
No. 9/1937 – Merchant Shipping (Spanish Civil War) Act 1937
No. 10/1937 – Central Fund Act 1937
No. 11/1937 – Widows' and Orphans' Pensions Act 1937
No. 12/1937 – Imposition of Duties (Confirmation of Orders) Act 1937
No. 13/1937 – Local Authorities (Electrical Employees) Act 1937
No. 14/1937 – Local Elections Act 1937
No. 15/1937 – Army Pensions Act 1937
No. 16/1937 – Plebiscite (Draft Constitution) Act 1937
No. 17/1937 – Local Loans Fund (Amendment) Act 1937
No. 18/1937 – Finance Act 1937
No. 19/1937 – Dairy Produce (Amendment) Act 1937
No. 20/1937 – Executive Powers (Consequential Provisions) Act 1937
No. 21/1937 – Court Officers (Amendment) Act 1937
No. 22/1937 – Appropriation Act 1937
No. 23/1937 – Pigs and Bacon Act 1937
No. 24/1937 – Dublin Hospitals Act 1937
No. 25/1937 – Electoral (Chairman of Dáil Éireann) Act 1937
No. 26/1937 – Control of Prices Act 1937
No. 27/1937 – Agricultural Produce (Cereals) (Amendment) Act 1937
No. 28/1937 – Commissioner of Valuation (Substitute) Act 1937
No. 29/1937 – Expiring Laws Act 1937
No. 30/1937 – Seanad Electoral (University Members) Act 1937
No. 31/1937 – Imposition of Duties (Confirmation of Orders) (No. 2) Act 1937
No. 32/1937 – Presidential Elections Act 1937
No. 33/1937 – Sea Fisheries (Protection of Immature Fish) Act 1937
No. 34/1937 – Fisheries (Tidal Waters) (Amendment) Act 1937
No. 35/1937 – Fisheries Act 1937
No. 36/1937 – Local Government (Nomination of Presidential Candidates) Act 1937
No. 37/1937 – Presidential Seal Act 1937
No. 38/1937 – Interpretation Act 1937
No. 39/1937 – Irish Nationality and Citizenship (Amendment) Act 1937
No. 40/1937 – Constitution (Consequential Provisions) Act 1937
No. 41/1937 – Defence Forces Act 1937
No. 42/1937 – Housing and Labourers Act 1937
No. 43/1937 – Seanad Electoral (Panel Members) Act 1937

Private Acts
No. 1/1937 – Pier and Harbour Provisional Order Confirmation Act 1937
No. 2/1937 – Local Government and Public Health Provisional Order Confirmation Act 1937
No. 3/1937 – Local Government (Galway) Act 1937

1938
No. 1/1938 – Agricultural Produce (Fresh Meat) (Amendment) Act 1938
No. 2/1938 – Unemployment Assistance (Amendment) Act 1938
No. 3/1938 – Shops (Hours of Trading) Act 1938
No. 4/1938 – Shops (Conditions of Employment) Act 1938
No. 5/1938 – Sheepskin (Control of Export) (Amendment) Act 1938
No. 6/1938 – Scrap Iron (Control of Export) Act 1938
No. 7/1938 – Shannon Fisheries Act 1938
No. 8/1938 – Defence Forces (Temporary Provisions) Act 1938
No. 9/1938 – Central Fund Act 1938
No. 10/1938 – Cork Fever Hospital (Amendment) Act 1938
No. 11/1938 – Cement (Amendment) Act 1938
No. 12/1938 – Finance (Agreement With United Kingdom) Act 1938
No. 13/1938 – Agreement With United Kingdom (Capital Sum) Act 1938
No. 14/1938 – Agricultural Products (Regulation of Import) Act 1938
No. 15/1938 – Prices Commission (Extension of Functions) Act 1938
No. 16/1938 – Agricultural Produce (Cereals) Act 1938
No. 17/1938 – Diseases of Animals Act 1938
No. 18/1938 – Collection of Taxes (Confirmation) Act 1938
No. 19/1938 – Imposition of Duties (Confirmation of Orders) Act 1938
No. 20/1938 – Appropriation Act 1938
No. 21/1938 – Public Hospitals (Amendment) Act 1938
No. 22/1938 – Slaughtered and Detained Animals (Compensation) Act 1938
No. 23/1938 – Industrial Alcohol Act 1938
No. 24/1938 – Presidential Establishment Act 1938
No. 25/1938 – Finance Act 1938
No. 26/1938 – Old Age Pensions Act 1938
No. 27/1938 – Telephone Capital Act 1938
No. 28/1938 – Expiring Laws Act 1938
No. 29/1938 – Public Servants (Continuity of Service) Act 1938
No. 30/1938 – Dairy Produce (Price Stabilisation) (Amendment) Act 1938
No. 31/1938 – Insurance (Amendment) Act 1938
No. 32/1938 – Red Cross Act 1938
No. 33/1938 – Defence Forces (Pensions) (Amendment) Act 1938
No. 34/1938 – Oireachtas (Allowances To Members) Act 1938
No. 35/1938 – Pigs and Bacon (Amendment) Act 1938
No. 36/1938 – Imposition of Duties (Confirmation of Orders) (No. 2) Act 1938
No. 37/1938 – Statutory Declarations Act 1938
No. 38/1938 – Ministerial and Parliamentary Offices Act 1938

Private Acts
No. 1/1938 – Erasmus Smith Schools Act 1938
No. 2/1938 – Mountjoy Square, Dublin, Act 1938

1939
No. 1/1939 – Holidays (Employees) Act 1939
No. 2/1939 – Agricultural Produce (Eggs) Act 1939
No. 3/1939 – Housing (Amendment) Act 1939
No. 4/1939 – Hospitals Act 1939
No. 5/1939 – Trade Loans (Guarantee) Act 1939
No. 6/1939 – Tariff Commission (Repeal) Act 1939
No. 7/1939 – Defence Forces (Temporary Provisions) Act 1939
No. 8/1939 – Central Fund Act 1939
No. 9/1939 – Local Government (Amendment) Act 1939
No. 10/1939 – Treason Act 1939
No. 11/1939 – Town and Regional Planning (Amendment) Act 1939
No. 12/1939 – Merchant Shipping (Amendment) Act 1939
No. 13/1939 – Offences Against The State Act 1939
No. 14/1939 – Local Authorities (Combined Purchasing) Act 1939
No. 15/1939 – Public Hospitals (Amendment) Act 1939
No. 16/1939 – Clerk of Seanad Éireann (Compensation) Act 1939
No. 17/1939 – Fisheries Act 1939
No. 18/1939 – Finance Act 1939
No. 19/1939 – Appropriation Act 1939
No. 20/1939 – Imposition of Duties (Confirmation of Orders) Act 1939
No. 21/1939 – Air-Raid Precautions Act 1939
No. 22/1939 – Agricultural Produce (Cereals) Act 1939
No. 23/1939 – Rates on Agricultural Land (Relief) Act 1939
No. 24/1939 – Tourist Traffic Act 1939
No. 25/1939 – Waterford City Management Act 1939
No. 26/1939 – Land Act 1939
No. 27/1939 – Public Assistance Act 1939
No. 28/1939 – Emergency Powers Act 1939
No. 29/1939 – Public Hospitals (Amendment) (No. 2) Act 1939
No. 30/1939 – Expiring Laws Act 1939
No. 31/1939 – Diplomatic and Consular Fees Act 1939
No. 32/1939 – Imposition of Duties (Confirmation of Orders) (No. 2) Act 1939
No. 33/1939 – Finance (No. 2) Act 1939
No. 34/1939 – Housing (Gaeltacht) (Amendment) Act 1939
No. 35/1939 – Pigs and Bacon (Amendment) Act 1939
No. 36/1939 – Ministers and Secretaries (Amendment) Act 1939

Constitutional Amendments
First Amendment of the Constitution Act 1939

1940–1949

1940
No. 1/1940 – Emergency Powers (Amendment) Act 1940
No. 2/1940 – Offences Against the State (Amendment) Act 1940
No. 3/1940 – Defence Forces (Temporary Provisions) Act 1940
No. 4/1940 – Unemployment Assistance (Amendment) Act 1940
No. 5/1940 – Central Fund Act 1940
No. 6/1940 – Seeds and Fertilisers Supply Act 1940
No. 7/1940 – Fire Brigades Act 1940
No. 8/1940 – Local Government (Remission of Rates) Act 1940
No. 9/1940 – Public Hospitals (Amendment) Act 1940
No. 10/1940 – Housing (Amendment) Act 1940
No. 11/1940 – Defence Forces (Temporary Provisions) (No. 2) Act 1940
No. 12/1940 – County Management Act 1940
No. 13/1940 – Institute For Advanced Studies Act 1940
No. 14/1940 – Finance Act 1940
No. 15/1940 – Local Authorities (Officers and Employees) (Amendment) Act 1940
No. 16/1940 – Emergency Powers (Amendment) (No. 2) Act 1940
No. 17/1940 – Appropriation Act 1940
No. 18/1940 – Emergency Powers (Continuance) Act 1940
No. 19/1940 – Local Elections (Amendment) Act 1940
No. 20/1940 – Seanad Electoral (Panel Members) (Bye-Elections) Act 1940
No. 21/1940 – Local Government (Dublin) (Amendment) Act 1940
No. 22/1940 – Local Authorities (Cost of Living) Act 1940
No. 23/1940 – Enforcement of Court Orders Act 1940
No. 24/1940 – Pigs and Bacon Act 1940
No. 25/1940 – Exported Live Stock (Insurance) Act 1940
No. 26/1940 – Imposition of Duties (Confirmation of Orders) Act 1940
No. 27/1940 – Offences Against the State (Forfeiture) Act 1940
No. 28/1940 – Local Loans Fund (Amendment) Act 1940
No. 29/1940 – Acquisition of Derelict Sites Act 1940
No. 30/1940 – University Colleges Act 1940
No. 31/1940 – Minerals Development Act 1940
No. 32/1940 – Expiring Laws Act 1940
No. 33/1940 – Widows' and Orphans' Pensions (Amendment) Act 1940
No. 34/1940 – Unemployment (Relief Works) Act 1940
No. 35/1940 – Imposition of Duties (Confirmation of Orders) (No. 2) Act 1940

Private Acts
No. 1/1940 – Local Government and Public Health Provisional Order Confirmation Act 1940
No. 2/1940 – Pier and Harbour Provisional Order Confirmation Act 1940
No. 3/1940 – Pier and Harbour Provisional Order Confirmation (No. 2) Act 1940
No. 4/1940 – Dublin Port and Docks Act 1940

1941
No. 1/1941 – Electricity (Supply) (Amendment) Act 1941
No. 2/1941 – Army Pensions Act 1941
No. 3/1941 – Unemployment Insurance Act 1941
No. 4/1941 – Central Fund Act 1941
No. 5/1941 – Cork City Management (Amendment) Act 1941
No. 6/1941 – Defence Forces (Temporary Provisions) Act 1941
No. 7/1941 – Seeds and Fertilisers Supply Act 1941
No. 8/1941 – Slievardagh Coalfield Development Act 1941
No. 9/1941 – Dairy Produce (Price Stabilisation) (Amendment) Act 1941
No. 10/1941 – Dairy Produce (Amendment) Act 1941
No. 11/1941 – Milk (Regulation of Supply and Price) (Amendment) Act 1941
No. 12/1941 – Children Act 1941
No. 13/1941 – Minerals Exploration and Development Company Act 1941
No. 14/1941 – Finance Act 1941
No. 15/1941 – Local Officers and Servants (Dublin) Act 1941
No. 16/1941 – Emergency Powers (Continuance) Act 1941
No. 17/1941 – Appropriation Act 1941
No. 18/1941 – Housing (Amendment) Act 1941
No. 19/1941 – Garda Síochána (Compensation) Act 1941
No. 20/1941 – Local Elections (Amendment) Act 1941
No. 21/1941 – Offences Against the State (Forfeiture) Act 1941
No. 22/1941 – Trade Union Act 1941
No. 23/1941 – Local Government Act 1941
No. 24/1941 – Neutrality (War Damage To Property) Act 1941
No. 25/1941 – Imposition of Duties (Confirmation of Orders) Act 1941
No. 26/1941 – Expiring Laws Act 1941
No. 27/1941 – Agriculture (Amendment) Act 1941
No. 28/1941 – Electoral Act 1941

Private Acts
No. 1/1941 – Local Government and Public Health Provisional Order Confirmation Act 1941
No. 2/1941 – Pier and Harbour Provisional Order Confirmation Act 1941

Constitutional Amendments
Second Amendment of the Constitution Act 1941

1942
No. 1/1942 – Water Supplies Act 1942
No. 2/1942 – Shops (Conditions of Employment) (Amendment) Act 1942
No. 3/1942 – Defence Forces (Temporary Provisions) Act 1942
No. 4/1942 – Central Fund Act 1942
No. 5/1942 – National Health Insurance Act 1942
No. 6/1942 – Imposition of Duties (Confirmation of Orders) Act 1942
No. 7/1942 – Insurance (Intermittent Unemployment) Act 1942
No. 8/1942 – Referendum Act 1942
No. 9/1942 – Building Societies Act 1942
No. 10/1942 – Air Navigation and Transport (Amendment) Act 1942
No. 11/1942 – Seeds and Fertilisers Supply Act 1942
No. 12/1942 – Taxes and Duties (Special Circumstances) Act 1942
No. 13/1942 – County Management (Amendment) Act 1942
No. 14/1942 – Finance Act 1942
No. 15/1942 – Housing (Amendment) Act 1942
No. 16/1942 – Offences Against the State (Forfeiture) Act 1942
No. 17/1942 – Electricity Supply Board (Superannuation) Act 1942
No. 18/1942 – Local Elections (Amendment) Act 1942
No. 19/1942 – Emergency Powers (Continuance and Amendment) Act 1942
No. 20/1942 – Appropriation Act 1942
No. 21/1942 – Customs (Amendment) Act 1942
No. 22/1942 – Central Bank Act 1942
No. 23/1942 – Trade Union Act 1942
No. 24/1942 – Superannuation Act 1942
No. 25/1942 – Expiring Laws Act 1942
No. 26/1942 – Registration of Title Act 1942
No. 27/1942 – Electricity (Supply) (Amendment) Act 1942

1943
No. 1/1943 – Defence Forces (Temporary Provisions) Act 1943
No. 2/1943 – Exported Live Stock (Insurance) Act 1943
No. 3/1943 – Saint Laurence's Hospital Act 1943
No. 4/1943 – Seeds and Fertilisers Supply Act 1943
No. 5/1943 – Central Fund Act 1943
No. 6/1943 – Local Government (Remission of Rates) Act 1943
No. 7/1943 – Intoxicating Liquor Act 1943
No. 8/1943 – Accidental Fires Act 1943
No. 9/1943 – Pawnbrokers (Divisional Auctioneers) Act 1943
No. 10/1943 – Landlord and Tenant (Amendment) Act 1943
No. 11/1943 – General Elections (Emergency Provisions) Act 1943
No. 12/1943 – Solicitors Act 1943
No. 13/1943 – District of Fergus Drainage Act 1943
No. 14/1943 – Army Pensions Act 1943
No. 15/1943 – Electoral (Polling Cards) Act 1943
No. 16/1943 – Finance Act 1943
No. 17/1943 – Creameries (Acquisition) Act 1943
No. 18/1943 – Appropriation Act 1943
No. 19/1943 – Vocational Education (Amendment) Act 1943
No. 20/1943 – Unemployment Insurance Act 1943
No. 21/1943 – Emergency Powers (Continuance) Act 1943
No. 22/1943 – Central Fund (No. 2) Act 1943
No. 23/1943 – Appropriation (No. 2) Act 1943
No. 24/1943 – Expiring Laws Act 1943

1944
No. 1/1944 – Housing (Amendment) Act 1944
No. 2/1944 – Children's Allowances Act 1944
No. 3/1944 – Agriculture (Amendment) Act 1944
No. 4/1944 – Defence Forces (Temporary Provisions) Act 1944
No. 5/1944 – Military Service Pensions (Amendment) Act 1944
No. 6/1944 – Fisheries (Amendment) Act 1944
No. 7/1944 – Seeds and Fertilisers Supply Act 1944
No. 8/1944 – Constitution (Verification of Petition) Act 1944
No. 9/1944 – Vocational Education (Amendment) Act 1944
No. 10/1944 – Midwives Act 1944
No. 11/1944 – Central Fund Act 1944
No. 12/1944 – Conditions of Employment Act 1944
No. 13/1944 – Local Authorities (Education Scholarships) Act 1944
No. 14/1944 – Collection of Taxes (Confirmation) Act 1944
No. 15/1944 – Trade Loans (Guarantee) (Amendment) Act 1944
No. 16/1944 – Emergency Powers (Continuance) Act 1944
No. 17/1944 – Appropriation Act 1944
No. 18/1944 – Finance Act 1944
No. 19/1944 – Comptroller and Auditor General (Amendment) Act 1944
No. 20/1944 – Red Cross Act 1944
No. 21/1944 – Transport Act 1944
No. 22/1944 – Expiring Laws Act 1944

Private Acts
No. 1/1944 – Local Government and Public Health Provisional Orders Confirmation Act 1944

1945
No. 1/1945 – Garda Síochána (Compensation) (Amendment) Act 1945
No. 2/1945 – Diseases of Animals Act 1945
No. 3/1945 – Arterial Drainage Act 1945
No. 4/1945 – Tuberculosis (Establishment of Sanatoria) Act 1945
No. 5/1945 – Seeds and Fertilisers Supply Act 1945
No. 6/1945 – Electoral (Dáil Éireann and Local Authorities) Act 1945
No. 7/1945 – Minerals Company Act 1945
No. 8/1945 – Local Government (Dublin) Act 1945
No. 9/1945 – Central Fund Act 1945
No. 10/1945 – Defence Forces (Temporary Provisions) Act 1945
No. 11/1945 – Military Service Pensions (Amendment) Act 1945
No. 12/1945 – Electricity (Supply) (Amendment) Act 1945
No. 13/1945 – Local Authorities (Cost of Living) (Amendment) Act 1945
No. 14/1945 – Customs (Temporary Provisions) Act 1945
No. 15/1945 – Presidential and Local Elections Act 1945
No. 16/1945 – Racing Board and Racecourses Act 1945
No. 17/1945 – Garda Síochána Act 1945
No. 18/1945 – Irish Legal Terms Act 1945
No. 19/1945 – Mental Treatment Act 1945
No. 20/1945 – Finance Act 1945
No. 21/1945 – Minister For Supplies (Transfer of Functions) Act 1945
No. 22/1945 – King's Inns Library Act 1945
No. 23/1945 – Unemployment Insurance Act 1945
No. 24/1945 – Juries Act 1945
No. 25/1945 – Court Officers Act 1945
No. 26/1945 – Emergency Powers (Continuance and Amendment) Act 1945
No. 27/1945 – Appropriation Act 1945
No. 28/1945 – Local Government (Remission of Rates) Act 1945
No. 29/1945 – Documents and Pictures (Regulation of Export) Act 1945
No. 30/1945 – Local Authorities (Acceptance of Gifts) Act 1945
No. 31/1945 – National Stud Act 1945
No. 32/1945 – Agricultural Wages (Amendment) Act 1945
No. 33/1945 – Johnstown Castle Agricultural College Act 1945
No. 34/1945 – Military Service Pensions (Amendment) (No. 2) Act 1945
No. 35/1945 – Finance (Miscellaneous Provisions) Act 1945
No. 36/1945 – Expiring Laws Act 1945
No. 37/1945 – Lough Corrib Navigation Act 1945

Private Acts
No. 1/1945 – Daniel Mcgrath Foundation Act 1945

1946
No. 1/1946 – Censorship of Publications Act 1946
No. 2/1946 – Housing (Amendment) Act 1946
No. 3/1946 – Army Pensions Act 1946
No. 4/1946 – Rent Restrictions Act 1946
No. 5/1946 – Aran Islands Transport Act 1946
No. 6/1946 – Central-Fund Act 1946
No. 7/1946 – Defence Forges (Temporary Provisions) Act 1946
No. 8/1946 – Children's Allowances (Amendment) Act 1946
No. 9/1946 – Harbours Act 1946
No. 10/1946 – Turf Development Act 1946
No. 11/1946 – Imposition of Duties (Confirmation of Order) Act 1946
No. 12/1946 – Land Act 1946
No. 13/1946 – Forestry Act 1946
No. 14/1946 – Tourist Traffic (Amendment) Act 1946
No. 15/1946 – Finance Act 1946
No. 16/1946 – Hire-Purchase Act 1946
No. 17/1946 – Superannuation Act 1946
No. 18/1946 – Appropriation Act 1946
No. 19/1946 – Continuation of Compensation Schemes Act 1946
No. 20/1946 – Local Government (Remission of Rates) Act 1946
No. 21/1946 – Courts of Justice (District Court) Act 1946
No. 22/1946 – Supplies and Services (Temporary Provisions) Act 1946
No. 23/1946 – Air Navigation and Transport Act 1946
No. 24/1946 – Local Government Act 1946
No. 25/1946 – Industrial Research and Standards Act 1946
No. 26/1946 – Industrial Relations Act 1946
No. 27/1946 – Telephone Capital Act 1946
No. 28/1946 – Air-Raid Precautions (Amendment) Act 1946
No. 29/1946 – Presidential Elections (Amendment) Act 1946
No. 30/1946 – Referendum (Amendment) Act 1946
No. 31/1946 – Electoral (Amendment) Act 1946
No. 32/1946 – Imposition of Duties (Confirmation of Order) (No. 2) Act 1946
No. 33/1946 – Intoxicating Liquor Act 1946
No. 34/1946 – Statistics (Amendment) Act 1946
No. 35/1946 – Expiring Laws Act 1946
No. 36/1946 – Rates on Agricultural Land (Relief) Act 1946
No. 37/1946 – Unemployment Insurance Act 1946
No. 38/1946 – Ministers and Secretaries (Amendment) Act 1946

1947
No. 1/1947 – Vocational Education (Amendment) Act 1947
No. 2/1947 – Industrial Alcohol (Amendment) Act 1947
No. 3/1947 – Flax Act 1936 (Suspension) Act 1947
No. 4/1947 – Defence Forces (Temporary Provisions) Act 1947
No. 5/1947 – Customs-Free Airport Act 1947
No. 6/1947 – The Industrial and Life Assurance Amalgamation Company, Limited (Acquisition of Shares) Act 1947
No. 7/1947 – Central Fund Act 1947
No. 8/1947 – Widows' and Orphans' Pensions Act 1947
No. 9/1947 – National Health Insurance Act 1947
No. 10/1947 – Auctioneers and House Agents Act 1947
No. 11/1947 – Deeds of Bravery Act 1947
No. 12/1947 – Immature Spirits (Restriction) Act 1947
No. 13/1947 – Sinn Féin Funds Act 1947
No. 14/1947 – Agricultural Credit Act 1947
No. 15/1947 – Finance Act 1947
No. 16/1947 – Dairy Produce (Amendment) Act 1947
No. 17/1947 – Trade Union Act 1947
No. 18/1947 – Agricultural and Fishery Products (Regulation of Export) Act 1947
No. 19/1947 – Comptroller and Auditor General (Amendment) Act 1947
No. 20/1947 – Courts of Justice Act 1947
No. 21/1947 – Great Southern Railways Company (Superannuation Scheme) Act 1947
No. 22/1947 – Presidential Establishment (Amendment) Act 1947
No. 23/1947 – Oireachtas (Allowances To Members) (Amendment) Act 1947
No. 24/1947 – Ministerial and Parliamentary Offices (Amendment) Act 1947
No. 25/1947 – Appropriation Act 1947
No. 26/1947 – Imposition of Duties (Confirmation of Order) Act 1947
No. 27/1947 – Clean Wool Act 1947
No. 28/1947 – Health Act 1947
No. 29/1947 – Superannuation Act 1947
No. 30/1947 – Civil Service (Transferred Officers) Compensation (Amendment) Act 1947
No. 31/1947 – Electoral (Amendment) Act 1947
No. 32/1947 – Live Stock (Artificial Insemination) Act 1947
No. 33/1947 – Finance (No. 2) Act 1947
No. 34/1947 – Harbours Act 1947
No. 35/1947 – Minerals Company Act 1947
No. 36/1947 – Solicitors (Amendment) Act 1947
No. 37/1947 – Irish Shipping Limited Act 1947
No. 38/1947 – Expiring Laws Act 1947
No. 39/1947 – Supplies and Services (Temporary Provisions) Act 1946 (Continuance) Act 1947
No. 40/1947 – Public Libraries Act 1947
No. 41/1947 – Garda Síochána (Pensions) Act 1947
No. 42/1947 – Seanad Electoral (Panel Members) Act 1947
No. 43/1947 – Appropriation (No. 2) Act 1947
No. 44/1947 – Statutory Instruments Act 1947
No. 45/1947 – Industrial and Commercial Property (Protection) (Neuchatel Agreement) Act 1947
No. 46/1947 – Merchant Shipping Act 1947
No. 47/1947 – Health Services (Financial Provisions) Act 1947
No. 48/1947 – Rates on Agricultural Land (Relief) Act 1947
No. 49/1947 – Poultry Hatcheries Act 1947
No. 50/1947 – Coroners (Amendment) Act 1947

1948
No. 1/1948 – Housing Amendment Act 1948
No. 2/1948 – Garda Síochána (Acquisition of Sites and Retention of Premises) Act 1948
No. 3/1948 – Local Government (Sanitary Services) Act 1948
No. 4/1948 – Local, Government (Superannuation) Act 1948
No. 5/1948 – Defence Forces (Temporary Provisions) Act 1948
No. 6/1948 – Central Fund Act 1948
No. 7/1948 – Imposition of Duties (Confirmation of Order) Act 1948
No. 8/1948 – Local Elections Act 1948
No. 9/1948 – Connaught Rangers (Pensions) Act 1948
No. 10/1948 – Social Welfare (Reciprocal Arrangements) Act 1948
No. 11/1948 – Trade Union Act 1948
No. 12/1948 – Finance Act 1948
No. 13/1948 – Appropriation Act 1948
No. 14/1948 – Local Government (Remission of Rates) Act 1948
No. 15/1948 – Local Government (Dublin) (Temporary) Act 1948
No. 16/1948 – Road Fund (Advances) Act 1948
No. 17/1948 – Social Welfare Act 1948
No. 18/1948 – Supplies and Services (Temporary Provisions) Act 1946 (Continuance) Act 1948
No. 19/1948 – Nurses Registration Act 1948
No. 20/1948 – Rates on Agricultural Land (Relief) Act 1948
No. 21/1948 – Expiring Laws Act 1948
No. 22/1948 – The Republic of Ireland Act 1948
No. 23/1948 – Workmen's Compensation (Amendment) Act 1948
No. 24/1948 – Agriculture (Amendment) Act 1948

1949
No. 1/1949 – Defence Forces (Temporary Provisions) Act 1949
No. 2/1949 – Imposition of Duties (Confirmation of Orders) Act 1949
No. 3/1949 – Local Loans Fund (Amendment) Act 1949
No. 4/1949 – Housing (Gaeltacht) (Amendment) Act 1949
No. 5/1949 – Central Fund Act 1949
No. 6/1949 – Children (Amendment) Act 1949
No. 7/1949 – Defence Forces (Pensions) (Amendment) Act 1949
No. 8/1949 – Courts of Justice (District Court) Act 1949
No. 9/1949 – Trade Loans (Guarantee) (Amendment) Act 1949
No. 10/1949 – Diseases of Animals Act 1949
No. 11/1949 – Trade Union Act 1949
No. 12/1949 – Electricity (Supply) (Amendment) Act 1949
No. 13/1949 – Finance Act 1949
No. 14/1949 – Seeds and Fertilisers Supply Act 1949
No. 15/1949 – Continuation of Compensation Schemes Act 1946 (Amendment) Act 1949
No. 16/1949 – Infanticide Act 1949
No. 17/1949 – Local Authorities (Works) Act 1949
No. 18/1949 – Fisheries (Amendment) Act 1949
No. 19/1949 – Army Pensions Act 1949
No. 20/1949 – Imposition of Duties (Confirmation of Orders) (No. 2) Act 1949
No. 21/1949 – Ministerial and Parliamentary Offices (Amendment) Act 1949
No. 22/1949 – Alginate Industries (Ireland) Limited (Acquisition of Shares) Act 1949
No. 23/1949 – Housing (Amendment) Act 1949
No. 24/1949 – Rent Restrictions (Amendment) Act 1949
No. 25/1949 – Land Reclamation Act 1949
No. 26/1949 – Appropriation Act 1949
No. 27/1949 – Fisheries (Statute Law Revision) Act 1949
No. 28/1949 – Army Pensions (Increase) Act 1949
No. 29/1949 – Military Service Pensions (Amendment) Act 1949
No. 30/1949 – Expiring Laws Act 1949
No. 31/1949 – Supplies and Services (Temporary Provisions) Act 1946 (Continuance) Act 1949
No. 32/1949 – Industrial and Commercial Property (Protection) (Amendment) Act 1949
No. 33/1949 – Irish News Agency Act 1949

1950–1959

1950
No. 1/1950 – Customs (Temporary Provisions) Act 1945 (Continuance) Act 1950
No. 2/1950 – Defence Forces (Temporary Provisions) Act 1950
No. 3/1950 – Pensions (Increase) Act 1950
No. 4/1950 – Air Navigation and Transport Act 1950
No. 5/1950 – Minerals Company (Amendment) Act 1950
No. 6/1950 – Irish Whiskey Act 1950
No. 7/1950 – Local Government (Remission of Rates) Act 1950
No. 8/1950 – Central Fund Act 1950
No. 9/1950 – Flax Act 1936 (Suspension) Act 1950
No. 10/1950 – Exported Live Stock (Insurance) Act 1950
No. 11/1950 – Imposition of Duties (Confirmation of Order) Act 1950
No. 12/1950 – Transport Act 1950
No. 13/1950 – Local Loans Fund (Amendment) Act 1950
No. 14/1950 – Social Welfare Act 1950
No. 15/1950 – Erne Drainage and Development Act 1950
No. 16/1950 – Land Act 1950
No. 17/1950 – Imposition of Duties (Confirmation of Orders) (No. 2) Act 1950
No. 18/1950 – Finance Act 1950
No. 19/1950 – Trade Union Act 1950
No. 20/1950 – Appropriation Act 1950
No. 21/1950 – Agricultural Workers (Holidays) Act 1950
No. 22/1950 – Rates on Agricultural Land (Relief) Act 1950
No. 23/1950 – Turf Development Act 1950
No. 24/1950 – Limerick City Management Act 1950
No. 25/1950 – Housing (Amendment) Act 1950
No. 26/1950 – Local Government (Repeal of Enactments) Act 1950
No. 27/1950 – Nurses Act 1950
No. 28/1950 – Rent Restrictions (Continuance and Amendment) Act 1950
No. 29/1950 – Industrial Development Authority Act 1950
No. 30/1950 – Macswiney (Pension) Act 1950
No. 31/1950 – Expiring Laws Act 1950
No. 32/1950 – Coinage Act 1950
No. 33/1950 – Vocational Education (Amendment) Act 1950
No. 34/1950 – Supplies and Services (Temporary Provisions) Act 1946 (Continuance and Amendment) Act 1950

Private Acts
No. 1/1950 – Local Government Provisional Orders Confirmation Act 1950

1951
No. 1/1951 – Tortfeasors Act 1951
No. 2/1951 – Criminal Justice Act 1951
No. 3/1951 – Imposition of Duties (Confirmation of Orders) Act 1951
No. 4/1951 – Rates on Agricultural Land (Relief) Act 1951
No. 5/1951 – Meath Hospital Act 1951
No. 6/1951 – Defence Forces (Temporary Provisions) Act 1951
No. 7/1951 – Central Fund Act 1951
No. 8/1951 – Court Officers Act 1951
No. 9/1951 – Arts Act 1951
No. 10/1951 – Collection of Taxes (Confirmation) Act 1951
No. 11/1951 – Imposition of Duties (Confirmation of Order) (No. 2) Act 1951
No. 12/1951 – Government Loans (Conversion) Act 1951
No. 13/1951 – Agricultural Workers (Weekly Half-Holidays) Act 1951
No. 14/1951 – Trade Union Act 1951
No. 15/1951 – Finance Act 1951
No. 16/1951 – Social Welfare Act 1951
No. 17/1951 – Post Office (Amendment) Act 1951
No. 18/1951 – Local Loans Fund (Amendment) Act 1951
No. 19/1951 – Telephone Capital Act 1951
No. 20/1951 – Appropriation Act 1951
No. 21/1951 – Freshwater Fisheries (Prohibition of Netting) Act 1951
No. 22/1951 – Seeds and Fertilisers Supply Act 1951
No. 23/1951 – Local Government (Remission of Rates) Act 1951
No. 24/1951 – Imposition of Duties (Confirmation of Orders) (No. 3) Act 1951
No. 25/1951 – Fishing Licences (Moville District) Act 1951
No. 26/1951 – Expiring Laws Act 1951
No. 27/1951 – Supplies and Services (Temporary Provisions) Act 1946 (Continuance) Act 1951
No. 28/1951 – Grain Storage (Loans) Act 1951
No. 29/1951 – Medical Practitioners Act 1951
No. 30/1951 – Pharmacy Act 1951

Private Acts
No. 1/1951 – Waterford (Extension of Harbour Limits) Harbour Works Order, 1951, Confirmation Act 1951

1952
No. 1/1952 – Undeveloped Areas Act 1952
No. 2/1952 – Defence Forces (Temporary Provisions) Act 1952
No. 3/1952 – Rates on Agricultural Land (Relief) Act 1952
No. 4/1952 – Electricity (Supply) (Amendment) Act 1952
No. 5/1952 – Foyle Fisheries Act 1952
No. 6/1952 – Central Fund Act 1952
No. 7/1952 – Sea Fisheries Act 1952
No. 8/1952 – Vital Statistics and Births, Deaths and Marriages Registration Act 1952
No. 9/1952 – Milk (Regulation of Supply and Price) (Amendment) Act 1952
No. 10/1952 – Imposition of Duties (Confirmation of Orders) Act 1952
No. 11/1952 – Social Welfare Act 1952
No. 12/1952 – Social Welfare (Children's Allowances) Act 1952
No. 13/1952 – Trade Union Act 1952
No. 14/1952 – Finance Act 1952
No. 15/1952 – Tourist Traffic Act 1952
No. 16/1952 – Housing (Amendment) Act 1952
No. 17/1952 – Appropriation Act 1952
No. 18/1952 – Veterinary Surgeons Act 1952
No. 19/1952 – Ministerial and Parliamentary Offices (Amendment) Act 1952
No. 20/1952 – Rent Restrictions (Continuance and Amendment) Act 1952
No. 21/1952 – Imposition of Duties (Confirmation of Orders) (No. 2) Act 1952
No. 22/1952 – Local Government (Sanitary Services) (Joint Burial Boards) Act 1952
No. 23/1952 – Local Government (Remission of Rates) Act 1952
No. 24/1952 – Finance (Excise Duties) (Vehicles) Act 1952
No. 25/1952 – Adoption Act 1952
No. 26/1952 – Agricultural Workers (Weekly Half-Holidays) Act 1952
No. 27/1952 – Pensions Act 1952
No. 28/1952 – Expiring Laws Act 1952
No. 29/1952 – Merchant Shipping (Safety Convention) Act 1952
No. 30/1952 – Supplies and Services (Temporary Provisions) Act 1946 (Continuance) Act 1952

1953
No. 1/1953 – Defence Forces (Temporary Provisions) Act 1953
No. 2/1953 – Trade Loans (Guarantee) (Amendment) Act 1953
No. 3/1953 – Local Loans Fund (Amendment) Act 1953
No. 4/1953 – Connaught Rangers (Pensions) Act 1953
No. 5/1953 – Military Service Pensions (Amendment) Act 1953
No. 6/1953 – Housing (Gaeltacht) (Amendment) Act 1953
No. 7/1953 – Insurance Act 1953
No. 8/1953 – National Stud Act 1953
No. 9/1953 – Central Fund Act 1953
No. 10/1953 – Local Government (Dublin) (Amendment) Act 1953
No. 11/1953 – Grass Meal (Production) Act 1953
No. 12/1953 – Local Government Act 1953
No. 13/1953 – Department of Lands (Establishment of Foresters) Act 1953
No. 14/1953 – Restrictive Trade Practices Act 1953
No. 15/1953 – Local Elections Act 1953
No. 16/1953 – Fisheries (Amendment) Act 1953
No. 17/1953 – Great Northern Railway Act 1953
No. 18/1953 – Land Act 1953
No. 19/1953 – Turf Development Act 1953
No. 20/1953 – Imposition of Duties (Confirmation of Orders) Act 1953
No. 21/1953 – Finance Act 1953
No. 22/1953 – Central Fund (No. 2) Act 1953
No. 23/1953 – Army Pensions Act 1953
No. 24/1953 – Comptroller and Auditor General (Amendment) Act 1953
No. 25/1953 – Workmen's Compensation (Amendment) Act 1953
No. 26/1953 – Health Act 1953
No. 27/1953 – Telegraph Act 1953
No. 28/1953 – Friendly Societies (Amendment) Act 1953
No. 29/1953 – Appropriation Act 1953
No. 30/1953 – Intoxicating Liquor Act 1953
No. 31/1953 – Supplies and Services (Temporary Provisions) Act 1946 (Continuance) Act 1953
No. 32/1953 – Courts of Justice Act 1953
No. 33/1953 – Imposition of Duties (Confirmation of Orders) (No. 2) Act 1953
No. 34/1953 – Rent Restrictions (Continuance and Amendment) Act 1953
No. 35/1953 – Mental Treatment Act 1953
No. 36/1953 – Rates on Agricultural Land (Relief) Act 1953
No. 37/1953 – Vocational Education (Amendment) Act 1953

Private Acts
No. 1/1953 – Local Government Provisional Order Confirmation Act 1953
No. 2/1953 – The Royal Hospital For Incurables, Dublin (Charter Amendment) Act 1953

1954
No. 1/1954 – Seanad Electoral (Panel Members) Act 1954
No. 2/1954 – Rent Restrictions (Amendment) Act 1954
No. 3/1954 – Local Loans Fund (Amendment) Act 1954
No. 4/1954 – Salmon Conservancy Fund Act 1954
No. 5/1954 – Defence Forces (Temporary Provisions) Act 1954
No. 6/1954 – Diseases of Animals Act 1954
No. 7/1954 – National Development Fund Act 1954
No. 8/1954 – Local Government (Temporary Reduction of Valuation) Act 1954
No. 9/1954 – State Guarantees Act 1954
No. 10/1954 – Consular Conventions Act 1954
No. 11/1954 – Industrial Research and Standards (Amendment) Act 1954
No. 12/1954 – Intestates' Estates Act 1954
No. 13/1954 – Central Fund Act 1954
No. 14/1954 – Superannuation Act 1954
No. 15/1954 – Imposition of Duties (Confirmation of Orders) Act 1954
No. 16/1954 – Housing (Amendment) Act 1954
No. 17/1954 – Electricity (Supply) (Amendment) Act 1954
No. 18/1954 – Defence Act 1954
No. 19/1954 – Collection of Taxes (Confirmation) Act 1954
No. 20/1954 – Appropriation Act 1954
No. 21/1954 – Land Act 1954
No. 22/1954 – Finance Act 1954
No. 23/1954 – Health Act 1954
No. 24/1954 – Cork Fever Hospital (Amendment) Act 1954
No. 25/1954 – State Property Act 1954
No. 26/1954 – Arbitration Act 1954
No. 27/1954 – Public Authorities (Judicial Proceedings) Act 1954
No. 28/1954 – Red Cross Act 1954
No. 29/1954 – Alginate Industries, (Ireland) Limited (Acquisition of Shares) Act 1954
No. 30/1954 – Exchange Control Act 1954
No. 31/1954 – Destructive Insects and Pests Act 1954
No. 32/1954 – Mortmain (Repeal of Enactments) Act 1954
No. 33/1954 – Agricultural Produce (Meat) (Miscellaneous Provisions) Act 1954
No. 34/1954 – Rent Restrictions (Continuance and Amendment) Act 1954
No. 35/1954 – Imposition of Duties (Confirmation of Orders) (No. 2) Act 1954
No. 36/1954 – Solicitors Act 1954
No. 37/1954 – National Monuments (Amendment) Act 1954
No. 38/1954 – Trade Loans (Guarantee) (Amendment) Act 1954

Private Acts
No. 1/1954 – Sir Patrick Dun's Hospital Act 1954

1955
No. 1/1955 – Medical Practitioners Act 1955
No. 2/1955 – Agriculture (Amendment) 1955
No. 3/1955 – Supplies and Services (Temporary Provisions) Act 1946 (Continuance and Amendment) Act 1955
No. 4/1955 – Central Fund Act 1955
No. 5/1955 – Tourist Traffic Act 1955
No. 6/1955 – Customs (Temporary Provisions) Act 1945 (Continuance) Act 1955
No. 7/1955 – Imposition of Duties (Confirmation of Orders) Act 1955
No. 8/1955 – Fertilisers Feeding Stuffs and Mineral Mixtures Act 1955
No. 9/1955 – Local Government Act 1955
No. 10/1955 – Factories Act 1955
No. 11/1955 – Social Welfare Act 1955
No. 12/1955 – City and County Management (Amendment) Act 1955
No. 13/1955 – Finance Act 1955
No. 14/1955 – Seed Production Act 1955
No. 15/1955 – Appropriation Act 1955
No. 16/1955 – Workmen's Compensation (Amendment) Act 1955
No. 17/1955 – Sea Fisheries (Amendment) Act 1955
No. 18/1955 – Charitable Donations and Bequests (Amendment) Act 1955
No. 19/1955 – Industrial Relations (Amendment) Act 1955
No. 20/1955 – Electricity (Supply) (Amendment) Act 1955
No. 21/1955 – Transport (Miscellaneous Provisions) Act 1955
No. 22/1955 – Imposition of Duties (Confirmation of Orders) (No. 2) Act 1955
No. 23/1955 – Arterial Drainage (Amendment) Act 1955
No. 24/1955 – Rent Restrictions (Continuance and Amendment) Act 1955
No. 25/1955 – Transport Act 1955
No. 26/1955 – Statutory Instruments (Amendment) Act 1955
No. 27/1955 – Social Welfare (Temporary Provisions) Act 1955
No. 28/1955 – Agricultural Produce (Eggs) Act 1955
No. 29/1955 – Mercantile Marine Act 1955

Private Acts
No. 1/1955 – Local Government Provisional Orders Confirmation Act 1955

1956
No. 1/1956 – Control of Exports (Temporary Provisions) Act 1956
No. 2/1956 – Gaming and Lotteries Act 1956
No. 3/1956 – Fatal Injuries Act 1956
No. 4/1956 – Wireless Telegraphy Act 1956
No. 5/1956 – Agricultural Produce (Cereals) (Amendment) Act 1956
No. 6/1956 – Forestry Act 1956
No. 7/1956 – Customs Act 1956
No. 8/1956 – Finance (Profits of Certain Mines) (Temporary Relief From Taxation) Act 1956
No. 9/1956 – Prisons Act 1956
No. 10/1956 – Local Government (Superannuation) Act 1956
No. 11/1956 – Supplies and Services (Temporary Provisions) Act 1946 (Continuance) Act 1956
No. 12/1956 – Central Fund Act 1956
No. 13/1956 – Road Transport Act 1956
No. 14/1956 – Imposition of Duties (Confirmation of Orders) Act 1956
No. 15/1956 – Restrictive Trade Practices (Confirmation of Order) Act 1956
No. 16/1956 – Restrictive Trade Practices (Confirmation Order) (No. 2) Act 1956
No. 17/1956 – Opticians Act 1956
No. 18/1956 – Rates on Agricultural Land (Relief) Act 1956
No. 19/1956 – Seeds and Fertilisers Supply Act 1956
No. 20/1956 – Tea (Importation and Distribution) Act 1956
No. 21/1956 – Ministers and Secretaries (Amendment) Act 1956
No. 22/1956 – Finance Act 1956
No. 23/1956 – Telephone Capital Act 1956
No. 24/1956 – Social Welfare (Amendment) Act 1956
No. 25/1956 – Oil Pollution of the Sea Act 1956
No. 26/1956 – Irish Nationality and Citizenship Act 1956
No. 27/1956 – Prisoners of War and Enemy Aliens Act 1956
No. 28/1956 – Fisheries (Statute Law Revision) Act 1956
No. 29/1956 – Local Loans Fund (Amendment) Act 1956
No. 30/1956 – Sea Fisheries (Amendment) Act 1956
No. 31/1956 – Housing (Amendment) Act 1956
No. 32/1956 – Appropriation Act 1956
No. 33/1956 – Restrictive Trade Practices (Confirmation of Order) (No. 3) Act 1956
No. 34/1956 – Imposition of Duties (Confirmation of Order) (No. 2) Act 1956
No. 35/1956 – Local Government (Temporary Reduction of Valuation) Act 1956
No. 36/1956 – Imposition of Duties (Confirmation of Orders) (No. 3) Act 1956
No. 37/1956 – Pigs and Bacon (Amendment) Act 1956
No. 38/1956 – Superannuation Act 1956
No. 39/1956 – Dairy Produce (Price Stabilisation) (Amendment) Act 1956
No. 40/1956 – Flour and Wheatenmeal Act 1956
No. 41/1956 – Animal Remedies Act 1956
No. 42/1956 – Milk and Dairies (Amendment) Act 1956
No. 43/1956 – Rent Restrictions (Continuance and Amendment) Act 1956
No. 44/1956 – Pensions (Increase) Act 1956
No. 45/1956 – Civil Service Commissioners Act 1956
No. 46/1956 – Civil Service Regulation Act 1956
No. 47/1956 – Finance (Miscellaneous Provisions) Act 1956
No. 48/1956 – Industrial Grants Act 1956

1957
No. 1/1957 – Voluntary Health Insurance Act 1957
No. 2/1957 – Central Fund Act 1957
No. 3/1957 – Supplies and Services (Temporary Provisions) Act 1946 (Continuance) Act 1957
No. 4/1957 – Imposition of Duties (Confirmation of Orders) Act 1957
No. 5/1957 – Married Women's Status Act 1957
No. 6/1957 – Statute of Limitations, 1957
No. 7/1957 – Imposition of Duties Act 1957
No. 8/1957 – Social Welfare Act 1957
No. 9/1957 – Social Welfare (Children's Allowances) Act 1957
No. 10/1957 – Turf Development Act 1957
No. 11/1957 – Small Dwellings Acquisition Act 1957
No. 12/1957 – Defence Forces (Pensions) (Amendment) Act 1957
No. 13/1957 – Industrial and Commercial Property (Protection) (Amendment) Act 1957
No. 14/1957 – Diseases of Animals (Bovine Tuberculosis) Act 1957
No. 15/1957 – Appropriation Act 1957
No. 16/1957 – Health and Mental Treatment Act 1957
No. 17/1957 – Connaught Rangers (Pensions) Act 1957
No. 18/1957 – Bretton Woods Agreements Act 1957
No. 19/1957 – Army Pensions Act 1957
No. 20/1957 – Finance Act 1957
No. 21/1957 – Social Welfare (Miscellaneous Provisions) Act 1957
No. 22/1957 – Rent Restrictions (Continuance and Amendment) Act 1957
No. 23/1957 – Undeveloped Areas (Amendment) Act 1957
No. 24/1957 – Scholarship Exchange (Ireland and the United States of America) Act 1957
No. 25/1957 – Local Loans Fund (Amendment) Act 1957
No. 26/1957 – Gas Regulation Act 1957
No. 27/1957 – Tourist Traffic Act 1957
No. 28/1957 – Children (Amendment) Act 1957
No. 29/1957 – Gaeltacht Industries Act 1957

Private Acts
No. 1/1957 — Local Government Provisional Order Confirmation Act 1957

1958
No. 1/1958 – Agriculture (An Foras Taluntais) Act 1958
No. 2/1958 – Landlord and Tenant (Reversionary Leases) Act 1958
No. 3/1958 – Office Premises Act 1958
No. 4/1958 – Prices Act 1958
No. 5/1958 – Tea (Importation and Distribution) Act 1956 (Continuance) Act 1958
No. 6/1958 – Central Fund Act 1958
No. 7/1958 – Imposition of Duties (Confirmation of Orders) Act 1958
No. 8/1958 – Trustee (Authorised Investments) Act 1958
No. 9/1958 – Local Government Act 1958
No. 10/1958 – Industrial Credit (Amendment) Act 1958
No. 11/1958 – Destructive Insects and Pests (Consolidation) Act 1958
No. 12/1958 – Greyhound Industry Act 1958
No. 13/1958 – Tea (Purchase and Importation) Act 1958
No. 14/1958 – Garda Síochána Act 1958
No. 15/1958 – Fisheries (Amendment) Act 1958
No. 16/1958 – Industrial Development (Encouragement of External Investment) Act 1958
No. 17/1958 – Agriculture (Amendment) Act 1958
No. 18/1958 – Turf Development Act 1958
No. 19/1958 – Transport Act 1958
No. 20/1958 – Great Northern Railway Act 1958
No. 21/1958 – Industrial and Commercial Property (Protection) (Amendment) Act 1958
No. 22/1958 – International Finance Corporation Act 1958
No. 23/1958 – Savings Banks Act 1958
No. 24/1958 – Agricultural Produce (Cereals) (Amendment) Act 1958
No. 25/1958 – Finance Act 1958
No. 26/1958 – Appropriation Act 1958
No. 27/1958 – Housing (Amendment) Act 1958
No. 28/1958 – Finance (Miscellaneous Provisions) Act 1958
No. 29/1958 – Customs-Free Airport (Amendment) Act 1958
No. 30/1958 – Exchange Control (Continuance) Act 1958
No. 31/1958 – Restrictive Trade Practices (Confirmation of Orders) Act 1958
No. 32/1958 – Rent Restrictions (Continuance and Amendment) Act 1958
No. 33/1958 – Control of Exports (Temporary Provisions) Act 1956 (Continuance) Act 1958
No. 34/1958 – Civil Service Regulation (Amendment) Act 1958
No. 35/1958 – Electricity (Supply) (Amendment) Act 1958
No. 36/1958 – Social Welfare (Amendment) Act 1958
No. 37/1958 – Health and Mental Treatment (Amendment) Act 1958
No. 38/1958 – Law Reform (Personal Injuries) Act 1958

Private Acts
No. 1/1958 – The Convalescent Home Stillorgan (Charter Amendment) Act 1958

1959
No. 1/1959 – Air Navigation and Transport Act 1959
No. 2/1959 – Turf Development Act 1959
No. 3/1959 – Irish Shipping Limited (Amendment) Act 1959
No. 4/1959 – Imposition of Duties (Confirmation of Orders) Act 1959
No. 5/1959 – Referendum (Amendment) Act 1959
No. 6/1959 – Central Fund Act 1959
No. 7/1959 – Companies Act 1959
No. 8/1959 – Administration of Estates Act 1959
No. 9/1959 – Presidential Elections, (Temporary Provisions) Act 1959
No. 10/1959 – Local Government Act 1959
No. 11/1959 – Rates on Agricultural Land (Relief) Act 1959
No. 12/1959 – Road Fund (Grants and Advances) (Temporary Provisions) Act 1959
No. 13/1959 – Social Welfare Act 1959
No. 14/1959 – Fisheries (Consolidation) Act 1959
No. 15/1959 – Army Pensions Act 1959
No. 16/1959 – Housing (Gaeltacht) (Amendment) Act 1959
No. 17/1959 – Ministers and Secretaries (Amendment) Act 1959
No. 18/1959 – Finance Act 1959
No. 19/1959 – Cheques Act 1959
No. 20/1959 – Export Promotion Act 1959
No. 21/1959 – Bankers' Books Evidence (Amendment) Act 1959
No. 22/1959 – Maritime Jurisdiction Act 1959
No. 23/1959 – Appropriation Act 1959
No. 24/1959 – Industrial Credit (Amendment) Act 1959
No. 25/1959 – Grass Meal (Production) (Amendment) Act 1959
No. 26/1959 – Industrial Grants Act 1959
No. 27/1959 – Tourist Traffic Act 1959
No. 28/1959 – Sea Fisheries (Amendment) Act 1959
No. 29/1959 – Air Navigation and Transport (No. 2) Act 1959
No. 30/1959 – Johnstown Castle Agricultural College (Amendment) Act 1959
No. 31/1959 – Transport Act 1959
No. 32/1959 – Funds of Suitors Act 1959
No. 33/1959 – Electoral (Amendment) Act 1959
No. 34/1959 – Rent Restrictions (Continuance and Amendment) Act 1959
No. 35/1959 – Courts of Justice Act 1959
No. 36/1959 – Shannon Free Airport Development Company Limited Act 1959
No. 37/1959 – Restrictive Trade Practices (Amendment) Act 1959
No. 38/1959 – Staff of the Houses of the Oireachtas Act 1959
No. 39/1959 – Apprenticeship Act 1959
No. 40/1959 – Transport (No. 2) Act 1959
No. 41/1959 – Comptroller and Auditor General (Amendment) Act 1959
No. 42/1959 – Finance (No. 2) Act 1959
No. 43/1959 – Pensions (Increase) Act 1959

Private Acts
No. 1/1959 – Local Government Provisional Order Confirmation Act 1959

1960–1969

1960
No. 1/1960 – Finance (Excise Duties) (Vehicles) (Amendment) Act 1960
No. 2/1960 – Army Pensions Act 1960
No. 3/1960 – Military Service Pensions (Amendment) Act 1960
No. 4/1960 – Connaught Rangers (Pensions) Act 1960
No. 5/1960 – Pensions (Amendment) Act 1960
No. 6/1960 – Macswiney (Pension) (Increase) Act 1960
No. 7/1960 – Petroleum and Other Minerals Development Act 1960
No. 8/1960 – Central Fund Act 1960
No. 9/1960 – Health Authorities Act 1960
No. 10/1960 – Broadcasting Authority Act 1960
No. 11/1960 – Imposition of Duties (Confirmation of Orders) Act 1960
No. 12/1960 – Oireachtas (Allowances To Members) and Ministerial and Parliamentary Offices (Amendment) Act 1960
No. 13/1960 – Housing (Amendment) Act 1960
No. 14/1960 – Elections Act 1960
No. 15/1960 – Hire-Purchase (Amendment) Act 1960
No. 16/1960 – University College Dublin Act 1960
No. 17/1960 – Dogs (Protection of Livestock) Act 1960
No. 18/1960 – Intoxicating Liquor Act 1960
No. 19/1960 – Finance Act 1960
No. 20/1960 – Restrictive Trade Practices (Confirmation of Order) Act 1960
No. 21/1960 – Telephone Capital Act 1960
No. 22/1960 – Defence (Amendment) Act 1960
No. 23/1960 – Local Government Act 1960
No. 24/1960 – Oil Burners (Standards) Act 1960
No. 25/1960 – Social Welfare (Amendment) Act 1960
No. 26/1960 – Diseases of Animals Act 1960
No. 27/1960 – Criminal Justice Act 1960
No. 28/1960 – Social Welfare (Miscellaneous Provisions) Act 1960
No. 29/1960 – Appropriation Act 1960
No. 30/1960 – Military Service Pensions (Increase) Act 1960
No. 31/1960 – Pensions (Amendment) (No. 2) Act 1960
No. 32/1960 – Irish Steel Holdings Limited Act 1960
No. 33/1960 – Macswiney (Pension) (Increase) (No. 2) Act 1960
No. 34/1960 – Veterinary Surgeons Act 1960
No. 35/1960 – International Development Association Act 1960
No. 36/1960 – Pensions (Increase) Act 1960
No. 37/1960 – Solicitors (Amendment) Act 1960
No. 38/1960 – Local Government (Temporary Reduction of Valuation) Act 1960
No. 39/1960 – Army Pensions (No. 2) Act 1960
No. 40/1960 – Local Government (No. 2) Act 1960
No. 41/1960 – Transport Act 1960
No. 42/1960 – Rent Restrictions Act 1960
No. 43/1960 – Electoral Act 1960
No. 44/1960 – Defence (Amendment) (No. 2) Act 1960
No. 45/1960 – Property Values (Arbitrations and Appeals) Act 1960
No. 46/1960 – Health (Fluoridation of Water Supplies) Act 1960

Private Acts
No. 1/1960 – The Institution of Civil Engineers of Ireland (Charter Amendment) Act 1960

1961
No. 1/1961 – Dairy Produce Marketing Act 1961
No. 2/1961 – Electricity (Supply) (Amendment) Act 1961
No. 3/1961 – Derelict Sites Act 1961
No. 4/1961 – Mental Treatment (Detention in Approved Institutions) Act 1961
No. 5/1961 – Connaught Rangers (Pensions) Act 1961
No. 6/1961 – Army Pensions (Increase) Act 1961
No. 7/1961 – Mental Treatment Act 1961
No. 8/1961 – Central Bank Act 1961
No. 9/1961 – Central Fund Act 1961
No. 10/1961 – Imposition of Duties (Confirmation of Orders) Act 1961
No. 11/1961 – Juries Act 1961
No. 12/1961 – Poisons Act 1961
No. 13/1961 – Agricultural Credit Act 1961
No. 14/1961 – Pigs and Bacon (Amendment) Act 1961
No. 15/1961 – Agricultural Produce (Eggs) Act 1961
No. 16/1961 – Courts of Justice and Court Officers (Superannuation) Act 1961
No. 17/1961 – Charities Act 1961
No. 18/1961 – Nurses Act 1961
No. 19/1961 – Electoral (Amendment) Act 1961
No. 20/1961 – Industrial Research and Standards Act 1961
No. 21/1961 – Hospitals Federation and Amalgamation Act 1961
No. 22/1961 – Social Welfare (Miscellaneous Provisions) Act 1961
No. 23/1961 – Finance Act 1961
No. 24/1961 – Road Traffic Act 1961
No. 25/1961 – Air Navigation and Transport Act 1961
No. 26/1961 – Medical Practitioners Act 1961
No. 27/1961 – Health (Corporate Bodies) Act 1961
No. 28/1961 – Insurance Act 1961
No. 29/1961 – Appropriation Act 1961
No. 30/1961 – Industrial Grants (Amendment) Act 1961
No. 31/1961 – Shannon Free Airport Development Company Limited (Amendment) Act 1961
No. 32/1961 – Milk (Regulation of Supply and Price) (Amendment) Act 1961
No. 33/1961 – Holidays (Employees) Act 1961
No. 34/1961 – Local Authorities (Education Scholarships) (Amendment) Act 1961
No. 35/1961 – Curragh of Kildare Act 1961
No. 36/1961 – Agricultural Workers (Holidays) (Amendment) Act 1961
No. 37/1961 – Tourist Traffic Act 1961
No. 38/1961 – Courts (Establishment and Constitution) Act 1961
No. 39/1961 – Courts (Supplemental Provisions) Act 1961
No. 40/1961 – Defamation Act 1961
No. 41/1961 – Civil Liability Act 1961
No. 42/1961 – Electricity (Temporary Provisions) Act 1961
No. 43/1961 – Control of Exports (Temporary Provisions) Act 1956 (Continuance) Act 1961
No. 44/1961 – Foyle Fisheries (Amendment) Act 1961
No. 45/1961 – Local Loans Fund (Amendment) Act 1961
No. 46/1961 – Turf Development Act 1961
No. 47/1961 – Agricultural Produce (Cereals) Act 1961

Private Acts
No. 1/1961 – The Iveagh Trust (Amendment) Act 1961

1962
No. 1/1962 – Garda Síochána Act 1962
No. 2/1962 – Pilotage (Amendment) Act 1962
No. 3/1962 – Road Fund (Grants) (Temporary Provisions) Act 1962
No. 4/1962 – Cement (Amendment) Act 1962
No. 5/1962 – Short Titles Act 1962
No. 6/1962 – Central Fund Act 1962
No. 7/1962 – Royal Hospital Kilmainham Act 1962
No. 8/1962 – State Lands (Workhouses) Act 1962
No. 9/1962 – Coroners Act 1962
No. 10/1962 – Imposition of Duties (Confirmation of Orders) Act 1962
No. 11/1962 – Geneva Conventions Act 1962
No. 12/1962 – Criminal Justice (Legal Aid) Act 1962
No. 13/1962 – Street and House To House Collections Act 1962
No. 14/1962 – Pharmacy Act 1962
No. 15/1962 – Finance Act 1962
No. 16/1962 – Restrictive Trade Practices (Confirmation of Orders) Act 1962
No. 17/1962 – Social Welfare (Miscellaneous Provisions) Act 1962
No. 18/1962 – Courts (Supplemental Provisions) (Amendment) Act 1962
No. 19/1962 – Appropriation Act 1962
No. 20/1962 – Restriction of Imports Act 1962
No. 21/1962 – Intoxicating Liquor Act 1962
No. 22/1962 – Army Pensions Act 1962
No. 23/1962 – Rates on Agricultural Land (Relief) Act 1962
No. 24/1962 – Electricity (Supply) (Amendment) Act 1962
No. 25/1962 – State Guarantees (Transport) Act 1962
No. 26/1962 – Local Government (Sanitary Services) Act 1962
No. 27/1962 – Housing (Loans and Grants) Act 1962
No. 28/1962 – Vocational Education (Amendment) Act 1962
No. 29/1962 – Statute Law Revision (Pre-Union Irish Statutes) Act 1962
No. 30/1962 – Restrictive Trade Practices (Confirmation of Order) (No. 2) Act 1962
No. 31/1962 – Fisheries (Amendment) Act 1962
No. 32/1962 – Oireachtas (Allowances To Members) Act 1962
No. 33/1962 – Military Service Pensions (Increase) Act 1962
No. 34/1962 – Army Pensions (Increase) Act 1962
No. 35/1962 – Connaught Rangers (Pensions) Act 1962
No. 36/1962 – Macswiney (Pension) (Increase) Act 1962
No. 37/1962 – Sugar Manufacture (Amendment) Act 1962
No. 38/1962 – Exchange Control (Continuance) Act 1962

1963
No. 1/1963 – Official Secrets Act 1963
No. 2/1963 – Nítrigin Éireann Teoranta Act 1963
No. 3/1963 – Undeveloped Areas (Amendment) Act 1963
No. 4/1963 – Industrial Grants (Amendment) Act 1963
No. 5/1963 – National Gallery of Ireland Act 1963
No. 6/1963 – Restrictive Trade Practices (Confirmation of Order) Act 1963
No. 7/1963 – Hotel Proprietors Act 1963
No. 8/1963 – Central Fund Act 1963
No. 9/1963 – Trade Marks Act 1963
No. 10/1963 – Copyright Act 1963
No. 11/1963 – Irish Steel Holdings Limited (Amendment) Act 1963
No. 12/1963 – Coast Protection Act 1963
No. 13/1963 – Control of Imports (Amendment) Act 1963
No. 14/1963 – Electricity (Supply) (Amendment) Act 1963
No. 15/1963 – Air Navigation (Eurocontrol) Act 1963
No. 16/1963 – Taiscí Stáit Teoranta Act 1963
No. 17/1963 – Transport Act 1963
No. 18/1963 – Local Government (Temporary Reduction of Valuation) Act 1963
No. 19/1963 – Electoral Act 1963
No. 20/1963 – Export Promotion (Amendment) Act 1963
No. 21/1963 – Sea Fisheries (Amendment) Act 1963
No. 22/1963 – Tourist Traffic Act 1963
No. 23/1963 – Finance Act 1963
No. 24/1963 – Superannuation and Pensions Act 1963
No. 25/1963 – Appropriation Act 1963
No. 26/1963 – Social Welfare (Miscellaneous Provisions) Act 1963
No. 27/1963 – Shannon Free Airport Development Company Limited (Amendment) Act 1963
No. 28/1963 – Local Government (Planning and Development) Act 1963
No. 29/1963 – Imposition of Duties (Confirmation of Orders) Act 1963
No. 30/1963 – Registration of Business Names Act 1963
No. 31/1963 – Telephone Capital Act 1963
No. 32/1963 – National Building Agency Limited Act 1963
No. 33/1963 – Companies Act 1963
No. 34/1963 – Stock Transfer Act 1963
No. 35/1963 – Funds of Suitors Act 1963

Private Acts
No. 1/1963 – The Limerick Harbour (Bridge) Act 1963

1964
No. 1/1964 – Firearms Act 1964
No. 2/1964 – Adoption Act 1964
No. 3/1964 – Central Bank Act 1964
No. 4/1964 – Broadcasting Authority (Amendment) Act 1964
No. 5/1964 – Criminal Justice Act 1964
No. 6/1964 – Central Fund Act 1964
No. 7/1964 – Guardianship of Infants Act 1964
No. 8/1964 – Health (Homes For Incapacitated Persons) Act 1964
No. 9/1964 – Courts (Supplemental Provisions) (Amendment) Act 1964
No. 10/1964 – Pensions (Increase) Act 1964
No. 11/1964 – Courts Act 1964
No. 12/1964 – Patents Act 1964
No. 13/1964 – Land Bond Act 1964
No. 14/1964 – Oireachtas (Allowances To Members) and Ministerial and Parliamentary Offices (Amendment) Act 1964
No. 15/1964 – Finance Act 1964
No. 16/1964 – Registration of Title Act 1964
No. 17/1964 – Civil Liability (Amendment) Act 1964
No. 18/1964 – Insurance Act 1964
No. 19/1964 – Agriculture (Amendment) Act 1964
No. 20/1964 – Control of Imports (Amendment) Act 1964
No. 21/1964 – Appropriation Act 1964
No. 22/1964 – Comptroller and Auditor General (Amendment) Act 1964
No. 23/1964 – Fisheries (Amendment) Act 1964
No. 24/1964 – Macswiney (Pension) (Increase) Act 1964
No. 25/1964 – Military Service Pensions (Increase) Act 1964
No. 26/1964 – Connaught Rangers (Pensions) Act 1964
No. 27/1964 – Army Pensions (Increase) Act 1964
No. 28/1964 – Social Welfare (Miscellaneous Provisions) Act 1964
No. 29/1964 – Local Government (Sanitary Services) Act 1964
No. 30/1964 – Transport Act 1964
No. 31/1964 – Pawnbrokers Act 1964
No. 32/1964 – Maritime Jurisdiction (Amendment) Act 1964
No. 33/1964 – Local Government (Repeal of Enactments) Act 1964
No. 34/1964 – Housing (Gaeltacht) (Amendment) Act 1964
No. 35/1964 – Rates on Agricultural Land (Relief) Act 1964
No. 36/1964 – State Guarantees (Amendment) Act 1964
No. 37/1964 – Industrial Grants (Amendment) Act 1964
No. 38/1964 – Local Loans Fund (Amendment) Act 1964
No. 39/1964 – Imposition of Duties (Confirmation of Orders) Act 1964
No. 40/1964 – Control of Manufactures Act 1964

Private Acts
No. 1/1964 – The Waterford Harbour Commissioners (Acquisition of Property) Act 1964

1965
No. 1/1965 – Oil Pollution of the Sea (Amendment) Act 1965
No. 2/1965 – Land Act 1965
No. 3/1965 – Control of Exports (Temporary Provisions) Act 1956 (Continuance) Act 1965
No. 4/1965 – Central Fund Act 1965
No. 5/1965 – British & Irish Steam Packet Company Limited (Acquisition) Act 1965
No. 6/1965 – Air Navigation and Transport Act 1965
No. 7/1965 – Mines and Quarries Act 1965
No. 8/1965 – Cork City Management (Amendment) Act 1965
No. 9/1965 – Turf Development Act 1965
No. 10/1965 – Protection of Animals (Amendment) Act 1965
No. 11/1965 – Trustee Savings Banks Act 1965
No. 12/1965 – Agricultural Credit Act 1965
No. 13/1965 – Pensions (Abatement) Act 1965
No. 14/1965 – Shannon Free Airport Development Company Limited (Amendment) Act 1965
No. 15/1965 – Electricity (Supply) (Amendment) Act 1965
No. 16/1965 – Imposition of Duties (Confirmation of Orders) Act 1965
No. 17/1965 – Extradition Act 1965
No. 18/1965 – Gaeltacht Industries (Amendment) Act 1965
No. 19/1965 – Local Elections Act 1965
No. 20/1965 – Social Welfare (Miscellaneous Provisions) Act 1965
No. 21/1965 – Appropriation Act 1965
No. 22/1965 – Finance Act 1965
No. 23/1965 – Prices (Amendment) Act 1965
No. 24/1965 – Labourers Act 1965
No. 25/1965 – State Guarantees (Transport) (Amendment) Act 1965
No. 26/1965 – Central Fund (Permanent Provisions) Act 1965
No. 27/1965 – Succession Act 1965

Private Acts
No. 1/1965 – The Royal, College of Surgeons in Ireland (Charter Amendment) Act 1965
No. 2/1965 – Local Government Provisional Order Confirmation Act 1965

1966
No. 1/1966 – Electoral (Amendment) Act 1966
No. 2/1966 – Health and Mental Treatment (Amendment) Act 1966
No. 3/1966 – Tourist Traffic Act 1966
No. 4/1966 – Air Companies Act 1966
No. 5/1966 – Coinage (Amendment) Act 1966
No. 6/1966 – Diseases of Animals Act 1966
No. 7/1966 – Broadcasting Authority (Amendment) Act 1966
No. 8/1966 – National Bank Transfer Act 1966
No. 9/1966 – Patents (Amendment) Act 1966
No. 10/1966 – Houses of the Oireachtas (Laying of Documents) Act 1966
No. 11/1966 – Restrictive Trade Practices (Confirmation of Order) Act 1966
No. 12/1966 – Industrial Grants (Amendment) Act 1966
No. 13/1966 – Electricity (Special Provisions) Act 1966
No. 14/1966 – Tea (Purchase and Importation) (Amendment) Act 1966
No. 15/1966 – Local Government (Reduction of Valuation) Act 1966
No. 16/1966 – Social Welfare (Occupational Injuries) Act 1966
No. 17/1966 – Finance Act 1966
No. 18/1966 – Ministers and Secretaries (Amendment) Act 1966
No. 19/1966 – Credit Union Act 1966
No. 20/1966 – Merchant Shipping Act 1966
No. 21/1966 – Housing Act 1966
No. 22/1966 – Finance (No. 2) Act 1966
No. 23/1966 – Imports (Miscellaneous Provisions) Act 1966
No. 24/1966 – Social Welfare (Miscellaneous Provisions) Act 1966
No. 25/1966 – Funds of Suitors Act 1966
No. 26/1966 – Transport Act 1966
No. 27/1966 – Exchange Control (Continuance) Act 1966
No. 28/1966 – Local Elections Act 1966
No. 29/1966 – Appropriation Act 1966

Private Acts
No. 1/1966 – Local Government Provisional Order Confirmation Act 1966
No. 2/1966 – The Institute of Chartered Accountants in Ireland (Charter Amendment) Act 1966
No. 3/1966 – The Huguenot Cemetery Dublin (Peter Street) Act 1966

1967
No. 1/1967 – Export Promotion (Amendment) Act 1967
No. 2/1967 – Institute For Advanced Studies (Amendment) Act 1967
No. 3/1967 – Landlord and Tenant (Ground Rents) Act 1967
No. 4/1967 – Local Government (Dublin) Act 1967
No. 5/1967 – Industrial Training Act 1967
No. 6/1967 – Income Tax Act 1967
No. 7/1967 – Income Tax (Amendment) Act 1967
No. 8/1967 – Diplomatic Relations and Immunities Act 1967
No. 9/1967 – Auctioneers and House Agents Act 1967
No. 10/1967 – Rent Restrictions (Amendment) Act 1967
No. 11/1967 – Air Companies (Amendment) Act 1967
No. 12/1967 – Criminal Procedure Act 1967
No. 13/1967 – Rates on Agricultural Land (Relief) Act 1967
No. 14/1967 – Agriculture (Amendment) Act 1967
No. 15/1967 – Censorship of Publications Act 1967
No. 16/1967 – Housing (Gaeltacht) (Amendment) Act 1967
No. 17/1967 – Finance Act 1967
No. 18/1967 – Social Welfare (Miscellaneous Provisions) Act 1967
No. 19/1967 – School Attendance (Amendment) Act 1967
No. 20/1967 – Livestock Marts Act 1967
No. 21/1967 – Redundancy Payments Act 1967
No. 22/1967 – Milk (Regulation of Supply and Price) (Amendment) Act 1967
No. 23/1967 – Appropriation Act 1967

1968
No. 1/1968 – Industrial Grants (Amendment) Act 1968
No. 2/1968 – Local Government (Buncrana) Act 1968
No. 3/1968 – Courts (Supplemental Provisions) (Amendment) Act 1968
No. 4/1968 – Defence Forces (Pensions) (Amendment) Act 1968
No. 5/1968 – Smelting Act 1968
No. 6/1968 – Local Government (Roads and Drainage) Act 1968
No. 7/1968 – Finance (Miscellaneous Provisions) Act 1968
No. 8/1968 – Oireachtas (Allowances To Members) (Amendment) Act 1968
No. 9/1968 – Control of Exports (Temporary Provisions) Act 1956 (Continuance) Act 1968
No. 10/1968 – Chester Beatty Library Act 1968
No. 11/1968 – Imposition of Duties (Dumping and Subsidies) Act 1968
No. 12/1968 – Army Pensions Act 1968
No. 13/1968 – Shannon Free Airport Development Company Limited (Amendment) Act 1968
No. 14/1968 – Continental Shelf Act 1968
No. 15/1968 – Motor Vehicles (Registration of Importers) Act 1968
No. 16/1968 – Industrial Grants (Amendment) (No. 2) Act 1968
No. 17/1968 – Merchant Shipping (Load Lines) Act 1968
No. 18/1968 – Fishery Harbour Centres Act 1968
No. 19/1968 – Performers' Protection Act 1968
No. 20/1968 – Firearms (Proofing) Act 1968
No. 21/1968 – Courts (Supplemental Provisions) (Amendment) (No. 2) Act 1968
No. 22/1968 – Oireachtas (Allowances To Members) and Ministerial and Parliamentary Offices (Amendment) Act 1968
No. 23/1968 – Standard Time Act 1968
No. 24/1968 – Local Authorities (Higher Education Grants) Act 1968
No. 25/1968 – Road Traffic Act 1968
No. 26/1968 – Wool Marketing Act 1968
No. 27/1968 – Local Loans Fund (Amendment) Act 1968
No. 28/1968 – Turf Development Act 1968
No. 29/1968 – Tourist Traffic Act 1968
No. 30/1968 – Gaeltacht Industries (Amendment) Act 1968
No. 31/1968 – Social Welfare (Miscellaneous Provisions) Act 1968
No. 32/1968 – Electricity (Supply) (Amendment) Act 1968
No. 33/1968 – Finance Act 1968
No. 34/1968 – Referendum (Amendment) Act 1968
No. 35/1968 – Broadcasting (Offences) Act 1968
No. 36/1968 – Appropriation Act 1968
No. 37/1968 – Finance (No. 2) Act 1968
No. 38/1968 – Imposition of Duties (Confirmation of Orders) Act 1968

1969
No. 1/1969 – Agricultural Produce (Cereals) (Amendment) Act 1969
No. 2/1969 – Telephone Capital Act 1969
No. 3/1969 – Electoral (Amendment) Act 1969
No. 4/1969 – Export Promotion (Amendment) Act 1969
No. 5/1969 – Insurance Act 1969
No. 6/1969 – Agricultural Credit Act 1969
No. 7/1969 – Holycross Abbey (County Tipperary) Act 1969
No. 8/1969 – Industrial Grants (Amendment) Act 1969
No. 9/1969 – Nelson Pillar Act 1969
No. 10/1969 – Bretton Woods Agreements (Amendment) Act 1969
No. 11/1969 – Shipping Investment Grants Act 1969
No. 12/1969 – Electricity (Special Provisions) (Repeal) Act 1969
No. 13/1969 – Curragh of Kildare Act 1969
No. 14/1969 – Industrial Relations Act 1969
No. 15/1969 – Collection of Taxes (Confirmation) Act 1969
No. 16/1969 – Housing Act 1969
No. 17/1969 – Agricultural Workers (Holidays and Wages) Act 1969
No. 18/1969 – Post Office (Amendment) Act 1969
No. 19/1969 – Social Welfare (Miscellaneous Provisions) Act 1969
No. 20/1969 – Air Companies (Amendment) Act 1969
No. 21/1969 – Finance Act 1969
No. 22/1969 – Grass Meal (Production) (Amendment) Act 1969
No. 23/1969 – Decimal Currency Act 1969
No. 24/1969 – Land Bond Act 1969
No. 25/1969 – National Stud Act 1969
No. 26/1969 – National University of Ireland Act 1969
No. 27/1969 – National Building Agency Limited (Amendment) Act 1969
No. 28/1969 – Restrictive Trade Practices (Confirmation of Order) Act 1969
No. 29/1969 – Immature Spirits (Restriction) Act 1969
No. 30/1969 – Appropriation Act 1969
No. 31/1969 – Transport Act 1969
No. 32/1969 – Industrial Development Act 1969
No. 33/1969 – Imposition of Duties (Confirmation of Orders) Act 1969

Private Acts
No. 1/1969 – The Institution of Civil Engineers of Ireland (Charter Amendment) Act 1969

1970–1979

1970
No. 1/1970 – Health Act 1970
No. 2/1970 – Local Government (Rates) Act 1970
No. 3/1970 – Agriculture (Amendment) Act 1970
No. 4/1970 – Nítrigin Éireann Teoranta Act 1970
No. 5/1970 – Electricity (Supply) (Amendment) Act 1970
No. 6/1970 – Gaming and Lotteries Act 1970
No. 7/1970 – Censorship of Films (Amendment) Act 1970
No. 8/1970 – Sea Fisheries (Amendment) Act 1970
No. 9/1970 – Shannon Free Airport Development Company Limited (Amendment) Act 1970
No. 10/1970 – Merchandise Marks Act 1970
No. 11/1970 – Prisons Act 1970
No. 12/1970 – Social Welfare Act 1970
No. 13/1970 – Local Government (Temporary Reduction of Valuation) Act 1970
No. 14/1970 – Finance Act 1970
No. 15/1970 – Vocational Education (Amendment) Act 1970
No. 16/1970 – Tourist Traffic Act 1970
No. 17/1970 – Imposition of Duties (Confirmation of Orders) Act 1970
No. 18/1970 – Housing Act 1970
No. 19/1970 – Horse Industry Act 1970
No. 20/1970 – Appropriation Act 1970
No. 21/1970 – Decimal Currency Act 1970
No. 22/1970 – Committee of Public Accounts of Dáil Éireann (Privilege and Procedure) Act 1970
No. 23/1970 – Exchange Control (Continuance) Act 1970
No. 24/1970 – Transport Act 1970
No. 25/1970 – Finance (No. 2) Act 1970

Private Acts
No. 1/1970 – The Dublin Cemeteries Committee Act 1970

1971
No. 1/1971 – International Health Bodies (Corporate Status) Act 1971
No. 2/1971 – Broadcasting Authority (Amendment) Act 1971
No. 3/1971 – Fuels (Control of Supplies) Act 1971
No. 4/1971 – Irish Steel Holdings Limited (Amendment) Act 1971
No. 5/1971 – Control of Exports (Temporary Provisions) Act 1956 (Continuance) Act 1971
No. 6/1971 – Local Government Services (Corporate Bodies) Act 1971
No. 7/1971 – Gaeltacht Industries (Amendment) Act 1971
No. 8/1971 – Road Transport Act 1971
No. 9/1971 – Industrial Credit (Amendment) Act 1971
No. 10/1971 – Insurance Act 1971
No. 11/1971 – British & Irish Steam Packet Company Limited (Acquisition) (Amendment) Act 1971
No. 12/1971 – Nuclear Energy (An Bord Fuinnimh Nuicleigh) Act 1971
No. 13/1971 – Firearms Act 1971
No. 14/1971 – Transport (Miscellaneous Provisions) Act 1971
No. 15/1971 – Local Government (Rateability of Rents) (Abolition) Act 1971
No. 16/1971 – Social Welfare Act 1971
No. 17/1971 – Standard Time (Amendment) Act 1971
No. 18/1971 – Electricity (Supply) (Amendment) Act 1971
No. 19/1971 – Air Navigation (Eurocontrol) Act 1971
No. 20/1971 – Redundancy Payments Act 1971
No. 21/1971 – Health Contributions Act 1971
No. 22/1971 – Higher Education Authority Act 1971
No. 23/1971 – Finance Act 1971
No. 24/1971 – Central Bank Act 1971
No. 25/1971 – Prohibition of Forcible Entry and Occupation Act 1971
No. 26/1971 – Army Pensions Act 1971
No. 27/1971 – Employment Agency Act 1971
No. 28/1971 – National College of Art and Design Act 1971
No. 29/1971 – Imposition of Duties (Confirmation of Orders) Act 1971
No. 30/1971 – Landlord and Tenant (Amendment) Act 1971
No. 31/1971 – Industrial and Provident Societies (Amendment) Act 1971
No. 32/1971 – Agriculture (Amendment) Act 1971
No. 33/1971 – Trade Union Act 1971
No. 34/1971 – Export Promotion (Amendment) Act 1971
No. 35/1971 – International Development Association (Amendment) Act 1971
No. 36/1971 – Courts Act 1971
No. 37/1971 – Appropriation Act 1971

1972
No. 1/1972 – Foir Teoranta Act 1972
No. 2/1972 – Garda Síochána Act 1972
No. 3/1972 – Agricultural Credit Act 1972
No. 4/1972 – Electoral (Amendment) Act 1972
No. 5/1972 – Wireless Telegraphy Act 1972
No. 6/1972 – Court Officers Act 1972
No. 7/1972 – Prisons Act 1972
No. 8/1972 – Restrictive Trade Practices (Confirmation of Orders) Act 1972
No. 9/1972 – Industrial Development Act 1972
No. 10/1972 – Dangerous Substances Act 1972
No. 11/1972 – Restrictive Practices Act 1972
No. 12/1972 – Local Elections Act 1972
No. 13/1972 – Rates on Agricultural Land (Relief) Act 1972
No. 14/1972 – Local Loans Fund (Amendment) Act 1972
No. 15/1972 – Social Welfare Act 1972
No. 16/1972 – Immature Spirits (Restrictions) Act 1972
No. 17/1972 – Unit Trusts Act 1972
No. 18/1972 – Restrictive Trade Practices (Confirmation of Order) Act 1972
No. 19/1972 – Finance Act 1972
No. 20/1972 – Prices (Amendment) Act 1972
No. 21/1972 – Ministerial and Parliamentary Offices Act 1972
No. 22/1972 – Value-Added Tax Act 1972
No. 23/1972 – Referendum (Amendment) Act 1972
No. 24/1972 – Electricity (Supply) (Amendment) Act 1972
No. 25/1972 – Births, Deaths and Marriages Registration Act 1972
No. 26/1972 – Offences Against the State (Amendment) Act 1972
No. 27/1972 – European Communities Act 1972
No. 28/1972 – Tourist Traffic Act 1972
No. 29/1972 – Imposition of Duties (Confirmation of Orders) Act 1972
No. 30/1972 – Marriages Act 1972
No. 31/1972 – Appropriation Act 1972
No. 32/1972 – County Management (Amendment) Act 1972

Constitutional Amendments
Third Amendment of the Constitution Act 1972
Fourth Amendment of the Constitution Act 1972
Fifth Amendment of the Constitution Act 1972

1973
No. 1/1973 – Broadcasting Authority (Amendment) Act 1973
No. 2/1973 – Social Welfare (Pay-Related Benefit) Act 1973
No. 3/1973 – Electoral (Amendment) Act 1973
No. 4/1973 – Minimum Notice and Terms of Employment Act 1973
No. 5/1973 – European Communities (Confirmation of Regulations) Act 1973
No. 6/1973 – Sugar Manufacture (Amendment) Act 1973
No. 7/1973 – Local Elections Act 1973
No. 8/1973 – Local Government (Rates) Act 1973
No. 9/1973 – Foir Teoranta (Amendment) Act 1973
No. 10/1973 – Social Welfare Act 1973
No. 11/1973 – Redundancy Payments Act 1973
No. 12/1973 – Regulation of Banks (Remuneration and Conditions of Employment) (Temporary Provisions) Act 1973
No. 13/1973 – Charities Act 1973
No. 14/1973 – Ministers and Secretaries (Amendment) Act 1973
No. 15/1973 – Road Traffic (Amendment) Act 1973
No. 16/1973 – Criminal Procedure (Amendment) Act 1973
No. 17/1973 – Civil Service (Employment of Married Women) Act 1973
No. 18/1973 – Presidential Establishment (Amendment) Act 1973
No. 19/1973 – Finance Act 1973
No. 20/1973 – European Communities (Amendment) Act 1973
No. 21/1973 – Dairy Produce (Miscellaneous Provision) Act 1973
No. 22/1973 – Oireachtas (Allowances To Members) and Ministerial and Parliamentary Offices (Amendment) Act 1973
No. 23/1973 – Auctioneers and House Agents Act 1973
No. 24/1973 – Place-Names (Irish Forms) Act 1973
No. 25/1973 – Holidays (Employees) Act 1973
No. 26/1973 – Courts Act 1973
No. 27/1973 – Army Pensions Act 1973
No. 28/1973 – Genocide Act 1973
No. 29/1973 – Air Navigation and Transport Act 1973
No. 30/1973 – International Development Association (Amendment) Act 1973
No. 31/1973 – Agricultural Credit Act 1973
No. 32/1973 – Telephone Capital Act 1973
No. 33/1973 – Arts Act 1973
No. 34/1973 – Appropriation Act 1973

1974
No. 1/1974 – Transport Act 1974
No. 2/1974 – National Building Agency Limited (Amendment) Act 1974
No. 3/1974 – Exchequer and Local Financial Years Act 1974
No. 4/1974 – Restrictive Practices (Confirmation of Orders) Act 1974
No. 5/1974 – Control of Exports (Temporary Provisions) Act 1956 (Continuance) Act 1974
No. 6/1974 – Local Government (Roads and Motorways) Act 1974
No. 7/1974 – Electoral (Amendment) Act 1974
No. 8/1974 – Local Elections (Petitions and Disqualifications) Act 1974
No. 9/1974 – Building Societies Act 1974
No. 10/1974 – Prisons Act 1974
No. 11/1974 – Food Standards Act 1974
No. 12/1974 – Social Welfare Act 1974
No. 13/1974 – Gaeltacht Industries (Amendment) Act 1974
No. 14/1974 – Social Welfare (No. 2) Act 1974
No. 15/1974 – Anti-Discrimination (Pay) Act 1974
No. 16/1974 – Maintenance Orders Act 1974
No. 17/1974 – Finance (Taxation of Profits of Certain Mines) Act 1974
No. 18/1974 – Export Promotion (Amendment) Act 1974
No. 19/1974 – Electricity (Supply) (Amendment) Act 1974
No. 20/1974 – Industrial Credit (Amendment) Act 1974
No. 21/1974 – Shannon Free Airport Development Company Limited (Amendment) Act 1974
No. 22/1974 – Prosecution of Offences Act 1974
No. 23/1974 – Agriculture (Amendment) Act 1974
No. 24/1974 – Adoption Act 1974
No. 25/1974 – Fisheries (Amendment) Act 1974
No. 26/1974 – Exchange Control (Continuance) Act 1974
No. 27/1974 – Finance Act 1974
No. 28/1974 – Local Loans Fund (Amendment) Act 1974
No. 29/1974 – Rates on Agricultural Land (Relief) Act 1974
No. 30/1974 – Sea Fisheries (Amendment) Act 1974
No. 31/1974 – Social Welfare (No. 3) Act 1974
No. 32/1974 – Health Contributions (Amendment) Act 1974
No. 33/1974 – Broadcasting Authority (Amendment) Act 1974
No. 34/1974 – Transport (No. 2) Act 1974
No. 35/1974 – Appropriation Act 1974

Private Acts
No. 1/1974 – The Leopardstown Park Hospital (Trust Deed Amendment) Act 1974

1975
No. 1/1975 – Social Welfare Act 1975
No. 2/1975 – Defence Forces (Pensions) (Amendment) Act 1975
No. 3/1975 – Law Reform Commission Act 1975
No. 4/1975 – Trade Union Act 1975
No. 5/1975 – Land Bond Act 1975
No. 6/1975 – Finance Act 1975
No. 7/1975 – Agricultural Workers (Holidays) (Amendment) Act 1975
No. 8/1975 – Social Welfare (Pay-Related Benefit) Act 1975
No. 9/1975 – Air Navigation and Transport Act 1975
No. 10/1975 – Restricted Licences Conversion Fund Act 1975
No. 11/1975 – Racing Board and Racecourses (Amendment) Act 1975
No. 12/1975 – Court of Justice of the European Communities (Perjury) Act 1975
No. 13/1975 – Appropriation Act 1975
No. 14/1975 – Local Authorities (Traffic Wardens) Act 1975
No. 15/1975 – Restrictive Practices (Confirmation of Order) Act 1975
No. 16/1975 – Industrial Development Act 1975
No. 17/1975 – Agricultural Credit Act 1975
No. 18/1975 – Gaeltacht Industries (Amendment) Act 1975
No. 19/1975 – Finance (No. 2) Act 1975
No. 20/1975 – Capital Gains Tax Act 1975
No. 21/1975 – Air Navigation and Transport (No. 2) Act 1975
No. 22/1975 – Turf Development Act 1975
No. 23/1975 – Employment Premium Act 1975
No. 24/1975 – Nítrigin Éireann Teoranta Act 1975
No. 25/1975 – Wealth Tax Act 1975
No. 26/1975 – Tourist Traffic Act 1975
No. 27/1975 – Regulation of Banks (Remuneration and Conditions of Employment) (Temporary Provisions) Act 1975
No. 28/1975 – Social Welfare (Supplementary Welfare Allowances) Act 1975
No. 29/1975 – Industrial Development (No. 2) Act 1975

1976
No. 1/1976 – ACP-EEC Convention of Lome (Contracts of Guarantee Between State and European Investment Bank) Act 1976
No. 2/1976 – Diplomatic Relations and Immunities (Amendment) Act 1976
No. 3/1976 – Rates on Agricultural Land (Relief) Act 1976
No. 4/1976 – Juries Act 1976
No. 5/1976 – Harbours Act 1976
No. 6/1976 – Social Welfare Act 1976
No. 7/1976 – Corporation Tax Act 1976
No. 8/1976 – Capital Acquisitions Tax Act 1976
No. 9/1976 – Health Contributions (Amendment) Act 1976
No. 10/1976 – Committees of the Houses of the Oireachtas (Privilege and Procedure) Act 1976
No. 11/1976 – Family Law (Maintenance of Spouses and Children) Act 1976
No. 12/1976 – British & Irish Steam Packet Company Limited (Acquisition) (Amendment) Act 1976
No. 13/1976 – Foyle Fisheries (Amendment) Act 1976
No. 14/1976 – Criminal Law (Jurisdiction) Act 1976
No. 15/1976 – Industrial Relations Act 1976
No. 16/1976 – Finance Act 1976
No. 17/1976 – Public Hospitals (Amendment) Act 1976
No. 18/1976 – Regulation of Banks (Remuneration and Conditions of Employment) (Temporary Provisions) Act 1976
No. 19/1976 – Dairy Produce (Miscellaneous Provisions) (Amendment) Act 1976
No. 20/1976 – Local Government (Planning and Development) Act 1976
No. 21/1976 – Organisation For Economic Co-Operation and Development (Financial Support Fund) (Agreement) Act 1976
No. 22/1976 – Superannuation and Pensions Act 1976
No. 23/1976 – Fisheries (Amendment) Act 1976
No. 24/1976 – Employment Premium Act 1976
No. 25/1976 – Foir Teoranta (Amendment) Act 1976
No. 26/1976 – National Stud Act 1976
No. 27/1976 – Family Home Protection Act 1976
No. 28/1976 – Social Welfare (No. 2) Act 1976
No. 29/1976 – Adoption Act 1976
No. 30/1976 – Gas Act 1976
No. 31/1976 – Appropriation Act 1976
No. 32/1976 – Criminal Law Act 1976
No. 33/1976 – Emergency Powers Act 1976
No. 34/1976 – Criminal Justice (Verdicts) Act 1976
No. 35/1976 – Electricity (Supply) (Amendment) Act 1976
No. 36/1976 – Air Companies (Amendment) Act 1976
No. 37/1976 – Broadcasting Authority (Amendment) Act 1976
No. 38/1976 – Building Societies Act 1976
No. 39/1976 – Wildlife Act 1976

Private Acts
No. 1/1976 – Local Government Provisional Order Confirmation Act 1976

1977
No. 1/1977 – Local Government (Water Pollution) Act 1977
No. 2/1977 – Health Contributions (Amendment) Act 1977
No. 3/1977 – Social Welfare Act 1977
No. 4/1977 – Bula Limited (Acquisition of Shares) Act 1977
No. 5/1977 – European Communities (Amendment) Act 1977
No. 6/1977 – Worker Participation (State Enterprises) Act 1977
No. 7/1977 – Protection of Employment Act 1977
No. 8/1977 – Intoxicating Liquor Act 1977
No. 9/1977 – Protection of Young Persons (Employment) Act 1977
No. 10/1977 – Unfair Dismissals Act 1977
No. 11/1977 – Courts Act 1977
No. 12/1977 – Misuse of Drugs Act 1977
No. 13/1977 – National Agricultural Advisory, Education and Research Authority Act 1977
No. 14/1977 – Prisons Act 1977
No. 15/1977 – Oil Pollution of the Sea (Amendment) Act 1977
No. 16/1977 – Employment Equality Act 1977
No. 17/1977 – Friendly Societies (Amendment) Act 1977
No. 18/1977 – Finance Act 1977
No. 19/1977 – Bretton Woods Agreements (Amendment) Act 1977
No. 20/1977 – Industrial Credit (Amendment) Act 1977
No. 21/1977 – Export Promotion (Amendment) Act 1977
No. 22/1977 – Telephone Capital Act 1977
No. 23/1977 – Dairy Produce (Miscellaneous Provisions) (Amendment) Act 1977
No. 24/1977 – Garda Síochána Act 1977
No. 25/1977 – National Board For Science and Technology Act 1977
No. 26/1977 – Control of Exports (Temporary Provisions) Act 1956 (Continuance) Act 1977
No. 27/1977 – Ministers and Secretaries (Amendment) Act 1977
No. 28/1977 – Ministers and Secretaries (Amendment) (No. 2) Act 1977
No. 29/1977 – Oireachtas (Allowances To Members) and Ministerial, Parliamentary and Judicial Offices (Amendment) Act 1977
No. 30/1977 – European Assembly Elections Act 1977
No. 31/1977 – Companies (Amendment) Act 1977
No. 32/1977 – Finance (Excise Duty on Tobacco Products) Act 1977
No. 33/1977 – Gaeltacht Industries (Amendment) Act 1977
No. 34/1977 – International Development Association (Amendment) Act 1977
No. 35/1977 – Nítrigin Éireann Teoranta Act 1977
No. 36/1977 – Appropriation Act 1977
No. 37/1977 – Industrial Development Act 1977

1978
No. 1/1978 – Consumer Information Act 1978
No. 2/1978 – Agricultural Credit Act 1978
No. 3/1978 – Shannon Free Airport Development Company Limited (Amendment) Act 1978
No. 4/1978 – Medical Practitioners Act 1978
No. 5/1978 – Social Welfare Act 1978
No. 6/1978 – Health Contributions (Amendment) Act 1978
No. 7/1978 – Landlord and Tenant (Ground Rents) Act 1978
No. 8/1978 – Road Transport Act 1978
No. 9/1978 – Rates on Agricultural Land (Relief) Act 1978
No. 10/1978 – Local Loans Fund (Amendment) Act 1978
No. 11/1978 – Restrictive Practices (Confirmation of Order) Act 1978
No. 12/1978 – Restrictive Practices (Confirmation of Order) (No. 2) Act 1978
No. 13/1978 – Agricultural Produce (Meat) (Miscellaneous Provisions) Act 1978
No. 14/1978 – Bord na Gaeilge Act 1978
No. 15/1978 – Commissioners of Public Works in Ireland (Acceptance of Trusteeship) Act 1978
No. 16/1978 – Landlord and Tenant (Ground Rents) (No. 2) Act 1978
No. 17/1978 – Mergers, Take-Overs and Monopolies (Control) Act 1978
No. 18/1978 – Fisheries (Amendment) Act 1978
No. 19/1978 – Road Traffic (Amendment) Act 1978
No. 20/1978 – International Development Association (Special Action Account) Act 1978
No. 21/1978 – Finance Act 1978
No. 22/1978 – Land Bond Act 1978
No. 23/1978 – Industrial and Provident Societies (Amendment) Act 1978
No. 24/1978 – Exchange Control (Continuance and Amendment) Act 1978
No. 25/1978 – Social Welfare (Amendment) Act 1978
No. 26/1978 – Local Authorities (Higher Education Grants) Act 1978
No. 27/1978 – Tobacco Products (Control of Advertising, Sponsorship and Sales Promotion) Act 1978
No. 28/1978 – Air Companies (Amendment) Act 1978
No. 29/1978 – Industrial Development Act 1978
No. 30/1978 – Insurance (Amendment) Act 1978
No. 31/1978 – Restrictive Practices (Confirmation of Order) (No. 3) Act 1978
No. 32/1978 – Appropriation Act 1978
No. 33/1978 – Capital Gains Tax (Amendment) Act 1978
No. 34/1978 – Value-Added Tax (Amendment) Act 1978
No. 35/1978 – Local Government (Financial Provisions) Act 1978

1979
No. 1/1979 – Defence (Amendment) Act 1979
No. 2/1979 – Electricity (Supply) (Amendment) Act 1979
No. 3/1979 – Tribunals of Inquiry (Evidence) (Amendment) Act 1979
No. 4/1979 – Health Contributions Act 1979
No. 5/1979 – Údarás na Gaeltachta Act 1979
No. 6/1979 – Gaming and Lotteries Act 1979
No. 7/1979 – Redundancy Payments Act 1979
No. 8/1979 – Social Welfare Act 1979
No. 9/1979 – Agriculture (An Chomhairle Oiliuna Talmhaiochta) Act 1979
No. 10/1979 – Referendum (Amendment) Act 1979
No. 11/1979 – Finance Act 1979
No. 12/1979 – Minerals Development Act 1979
No. 13/1979 – Irish Steel Holdings Limited (Amendment) Act 1979
No. 14/1979 – Restrictive Practices (Confirmation of Order) Act 1979
No. 15/1979 – Courts Act 1979
No. 16/1979 – Garda Síochána Act 1979
No. 17/1979 – Trustee Savings Banks Act 1979
No. 18/1979 – Transport (Miscellaneous Provisions) Act 1979
No. 19/1979 – European Assembly (Irish Representatives) Act 1979
No. 20/1979 – Health (Family Planning) Act 1979
No. 21/1979 – Dangerous Substances (Amendment) Act 1979
No. 22/1979 – Tourist Traffic Act 1979
No. 23/1979 – British & Irish Steam Packet Company Limited (Acquisition) (Amendment) Act 1979
No. 24/1979 – Milk (Miscellaneous Provisions) Act 1979
No. 25/1979 – Córas Beostoic agus Feola Act 1979
No. 26/1979 – Bovine Diseases (Levies) Act 1979
No. 27/1979 – Housing (Miscellaneous Provisions) Act 1979
No. 28/1979 – Defence (Amendment) (No. 2) Act 1979
No. 29/1979 – Housing (Gaeltacht) (Amendment) Act 1979
No. 30/1979 – National Council For Educational Awards Act 1979
No. 31/1979 – Agricultural Credit Act 1979
No. 32/1979 – European Communities (Amendment) Act 1979
No. 33/1979 – Industrial Research and Standards (Amendment) Act 1979
No. 34/1979 – Local Government (Toll Roads) Act 1979
No. 35/1979 – Occasional Trading Act 1979
No. 36/1979 – Broadcasting Authority (Amendment) Act 1979
No. 37/1979 – Merchant Shipping (Certification of Seamen) Act 1979
No. 38/1979 – Dairy Produce (Miscellaneous Provisions) (Amendment) Act 1979
No. 39/1979 – Industrial Credit (Amendment) Act 1979
No. 40/1979 – Payment of Wages Act 1979
No. 41/1979 – Appropriation Act 1979

Private Acts
No. 1/1979 – The Royal College of Physicians of Ireland (Charter and Letters Patent Amendment) Act 1979
No. 2/1979 – Local Government Provisional Order Confirmation Act 1979

Constitutional Amendments
Sixth Amendment of the Constitution (Adoption) Act 1979
Seventh Amendment of the Constitution (Election of Members of Seanad Éireann by Institutions of Higher Education) Act 1979

1980–1989

1980
No. 1/1980 – Fisheries Act 1980
No. 2/1980 – Ministers and Secretaries (Amendment) Act 1980
No. 3/1980 – Social Welfare Act 1980
No. 4/1980 – Employment Guarantee Fund Act 1980
No. 5/1980 – Land Bond Act 1980
No. 6/1980 – Prisons Act 1980
No. 7/1980 – Arbitration Act 1980
No. 8/1980 – Local Government (Superannuation) Act 1980
No. 9/1980 – Safety in Industry Act 1980
No. 10/1980 – Landlord and Tenant (Amendment) Act 1980
No. 11/1980 – Packaged Goods (Quantity Control) Act 1980
No. 12/1980 – Agriculture (Amendment) Act 1980
No. 13/1980 – Turf Development Act 1980
No. 14/1980 – Finance Act 1980
No. 15/1980 – International Development Association (Amendment) Act 1980
No. 16/1980 – Sale of Goods and Supply of Services Act 1980
No. 17/1980 – Electoral (Amendment) Act 1980
No. 18/1980 – Export Promotion (Amendment) Act 1980
No. 19/1980 – Restrictive Practices (Confirmation of Order) Act 1980
No. 20/1980 – Rates on Agricultural Land (Relief) Act 1980
No. 21/1980 – Army Pensions Act 1980
No. 22/1980 – Fishery Harbour Centres Act 1980
No. 23/1980 – Trading Stamps Act 1980
No. 24/1980 – Plant Varieties (Proprietary Rights) Act 1980
No. 25/1980 – National Institute For Higher Education, Limerick, Act 1980
No. 26/1980 – Ombudsman Act 1980
No. 27/1980 – Pyramid Selling Act 1980
No. 28/1980 – Shannon Free Airport Development Company Limited (Amendment) Act 1980
No. 29/1980 – Social Welfare (Temporary Provisions) Act 1980
No. 30/1980 – National Institute For Higher Education, Dublin, Act 1980
No. 31/1980 – Building Societies (Amendment) Act 1980
No. 32/1980 – Johnstown Castle Agricultural College (Amendment) Act 1980
No. 33/1980 – Irish Whiskey Act 1980
No. 34/1980 – Thomond College of Education, Limerick, Act 1980
No. 35/1980 – Gas (Amendment) Act 1980
No. 36/1980 – Irish Film Board Act 1980
No. 37/1980 – National Film Studios of Ireland Limited Act 1980
No. 38/1980 – Restrictive Practices (Confirmation of Order) (No. 2) Act 1980
No. 39/1980 – Irish Shipping Limited (Amendment) Act 1980
No. 40/1980 – Electoral (Amendment) (No. 2) Act 1980
No. 41/1980 – Local Loans Fund (Amendment) Act 1980
No. 42/1980 – Industrial Alcohol (Amendment) Act 1980
No. 43/1980 – Casual Trading Act 1980
No. 44/1980 – Appropriation Act 1980

1981
No. 1/1981 – Social Welfare (Consolidation) Act 1981
No. 2/1981 – Maternity Protection of Employees Act 1981
No. 3/1981 – Social Welfare (Amendment) Act 1981
No. 4/1981 – Restrictive Practices (Confirmation of Order) Act 1981
No. 5/1981 – Intoxicating Liquor Act 1981
No. 6/1981 – Night Work (Bakeries) (Amendment) Act 1981
No. 7/1981 – Restrictive Practices (Confirmation of Order) (No. 2) Act 1981
No. 8/1981 – Dumping At Sea Act 1981
No. 9/1981 – Malicious Injuries Act 1981
No. 10/1981 – Criminal Law (Rape) Act 1981
No. 11/1981 – Courts Act 1981
No. 12/1981 – Nítrigin Éireann Teoranta Act 1981
No. 13/1981 – Industrial Development Act 1981
No. 14/1981 – Industrial Development (No. 2) Act 1981
No. 15/1981 – Telecommunications Capital Act 1981
No. 16/1981 – Finance Act 1981
No. 17/1981 – Health (Mental Services) Act 1981
No. 18/1981 – Hallmarking Act 1981
No. 19/1981 – Employers' Employment Contribution Scheme Act 1981
No. 20/1981 – Turf Development Act 1981
No. 21/1981 – Family Law (Protection of Spouses and Children) Act 1981
No. 22/1981 – Family Law Act 1981
No. 23/1981 – Transport Act 1981
No. 24/1981 – Electricity (Supply) (Amendment) Act 1981
No. 25/1981 – Employment Guarantee Fund (Amendment) Act 1981
No. 26/1981 – Rent Restrictions (Temporary Provisions) Act 1981
No. 27/1981 – Irish Telecommunications Investments Limited Act 1981
No. 28/1981 – Finance (No. 2) Act 1981
No. 29/1981 – Social Welfare (Temporary Provisions) Act 1981
No. 30/1981 – Fire Services Act 1981
No. 31/1981 – Courts (No. 2) Act 1981
No. 32/1981 – Youth Employment Agency Act 1981
No. 33/1981 – Merchant Shipping Act 1981
No. 34/1981 – Insurance Act 1981
No. 35/1981 – Rent Restrictions (Temporary Provisions) (Continuance) Act 1981
No. 36/1981 – Appropriation Act 1981
No. 37/1981 – Housing Finance Agency Act 1981

1982
No. 1/1982 – Fóir Teoranta (Amendment) Act 1982
No. 2/1982 – Social Welfare Act 1982
No. 3/1982 – Transport (Tour Operators and Travel Agents) Act 1982
No. 4/1982 – Rent Restrictions (Temporary Provisions) (Continuance) Act 1982
No. 5/1982 – Prevention of Electoral Abuses Act 1982
No. 6/1982 – Housing (Private Rented Dwellings) Act 1982
No. 7/1982 – International Common Fund For Commodities Act 1982
No. 8/1982 – Irish Shipping Limited Act 1982
No. 9/1982 – British & Irish Steam Packet Company Limited (Acquisition) (Amendment) Act 1982
No. 10/1982 – Companies (Amendment) Act 1982
No. 11/1982 – Litter Act 1982
No. 12/1982 – Sea Fisheries (Amendment) Act 1982
No. 13/1982 – Irish Steel Holdings Limited (Amendment) Act 1982
No. 14/1982 – Finance Act 1982
No. 15/1982 – Trade Disputes (Amendment) Act 1982
No. 16/1982 – Gas Regulation Act 1982
No. 17/1982 – Gas (Amendment) Act 1982
No. 18/1982 – Fuels (Control of Supplies) Act 1982
No. 19/1982 – Sugar Manufacture (Amendment) Act 1982
No. 20/1982 – National Community Development Agency Act 1982
No. 21/1982 – Local Government (Planning and Development) Act 1982
No. 22/1982 – Electricity (Supply) (Amendment) Act 1982
No. 23/1982 – Social Welfare (No. 2) Act 1982
No. 24/1982 – Agricultural Credit Act 1982
No. 25/1982 – Exchange Control (Continuance) Act 1982
No. 26/1982 – Kilkenny Design Workshops Limited Act 1982
No. 27/1982 – Housing Finance Agency (Amendment) Act 1982
No. 28/1982 – Control of Exports (Temporary Provisions) Act 1956 (Continuance) Act 1982
No. 29/1982 – Appropriation Act 1982

1983
No. 1/1983 – Local Authorities (Officers and Employees) Act 1983
No. 2/1983 – Foyle Fisheries (Amendment) Act 1983
No. 3/1983 – Air Companies (Amendment) Act 1983
No. 4/1983 – Export Promotion (Amendment) Act 1983
No. 5/1983 – Insurance Act 1983
No. 6/1983 – Social Welfare Act 1983
No. 7/1983 – Industrial Credit (Amendment) Act 1983
No. 8/1983 – Irish Telecommunications Investments Limited (Amendment) Act 1983
No. 9/1983 – Land Bond Act 1983
No. 10/1983 – Local Government (Financial Provisions) Act 1983
No. 11/1983 – Statute Law Revision Act 1983
No. 12/1983 – Shannon Free Airport Development Company Limited (Amendment) Act 1983
No. 13/1983 – Companies (Amendment) Act 1983
No. 14/1983 – Referendum (Amendment) Act 1983
No. 15/1983 – Finance Act 1983
No. 16/1983 – Local Loans Fund (Amendment) Act 1983
No. 17/1983 – Irish Steel Limited (Amendment) Act 1983
No. 18/1983 – Merchant Shipping (Light Dues) Act 1983
No. 19/1983 – Courts-Martial Appeals Act 1983
No. 20/1983 – Landlord and Tenant (Ground Rents) (Amendment) Act 1983
No. 21/1983 – Local Government (Financial Provisions) (No. 2) Act 1983
No. 22/1983 – Housing (Private Rented Dwellings) (Amendment) Act 1983
No. 23/1983 – Criminal Justice (Community Service) Act 1983
No. 24/1983 – Postal and Telecommunications Services Act 1983
No. 25/1983 – Building Societies (Amendment) Act 1983
No. 26/1983 – Turf Development Act 1983
No. 27/1983 – Fisheries (Amendment) Act 1983
No. 28/1983 – Local Government (Planning and Development) Act 1983
No. 29/1983 – Insurance (No. 2) Act 1983
No. 30/1983 – Dentists (Amendment) Act 1983
No. 31/1983 – Tourist Traffic Act 1983
No. 32/1983 – Oireachtas (Allowances To Members) and Ministerial, Parliamentary and Judicial Offices (Amendment) Act 1983
No. 33/1983 – International Development Association (Amendment) Act 1983
No. 34/1983 – Intoxicating Liquor (National Concert Hall) Act 1983
No. 35/1983 – Control of Exports Act 1983
No. 36/1983 – Electoral (Amendment) Act 1983
No. 37/1983 – Transport Act 1983
No. 38/1983 – Air Navigation (Eurocontrol) Act 1983
No. 39/1983 – Export Promotion (Amendment) (No. 2) Act 1983
No. 40/1983 – Ministers and Secretaries (Amendment) Act 1983
No. 41/1983 – Appropriation Act 1983
No. 42/1983 – Fóir Teoranta (Amendment) Act 1983

Constitutional Amendments
Eighth Amendment of the Constitution Act 1983

1984
No. 1/1984 – Housing Act 1984
No. 2/1984 – National Social Service Board Act 1984
No. 3/1984 – Dairy Produce (Miscellaneous Provisions) (Amendment) Act 1984
No. 4/1984 – Landlord and Tenant (Amendment) Act 1984
No. 5/1984 – Social Welfare Act 1984
No. 6/1984 – European Assembly Elections Act 1984
No. 7/1984 – Referendum (Amendment) Act 1984
No. 8/1984 – Irish Shipping Limited (Amendment) Act 1984
No. 9/1984 – Finance Act 1984
No. 10/1984 – Postal and Telecommunications Services (Amendment) Act 1984
No. 11/1984 – Wool Marketing Act 1984
No. 12/1984 – Exported Live Stock (Insurance) Act 1984
No. 13/1984 – Protection of Animals Kept For Farming Purposes Act 1984
No. 14/1984 – Irish Steel Limited (Amendment) Act 1984
No. 15/1984 – Landlord and Tenant (Ground Rents) (Amendment) Act 1984
No. 16/1984 – Road Traffic (Amendment) Act 1984
No. 17/1984 – Funds of Suitors Act 1984
No. 18/1984 – Misuse of Drugs Act 1984
No. 19/1984 – Ombudsman (Amendment) Act 1984
No. 20/1984 – European Communities (Supplementary Funding) Act 1984
No. 21/1984 – Protection of Employees (Employers' Insolvency) Act 1984
No. 22/1984 – Criminal Justice Act 1984
No. 23/1984 – State Financial Transactions (Special Provisions) Act 1984
No. 24/1984 – Land Act 1984
No. 25/1984 – Registration of Potato Growers and Potato Packers Act 1984
No. 26/1984 – Appropriation Act 1984
No. 27/1984 – Social Welfare (Amendment) Act 1984

Constitutional Amendments
Ninth Amendment of the Constitution Act 1984

1985
No. 1/1985 – European Communities (Amendment) Act 1985
No. 2/1985 – Age of Majority Act 1985
No. 3/1985 – Offences Against the State (Amendment) Act 1985
No. 4/1985 – Health (Family Planning) (Amendment) Act 1985
No. 5/1985 – Social Welfare Act 1985
No. 6/1985 – Electricity (Supply) (Amendment) Act 1985
No. 7/1985 – Local Government (Reorganisation) Act 1985
No. 8/1985 – Insurance (Miscellaneous Provisions) Act 1985
No. 9/1985 – Dentists Act 1985
No. 10/1985 – Finance Act 1985
No. 11/1985 – Animals Act 1985
No. 12/1985 – Electoral (Amendment) Act 1985
No. 13/1985 – Control of Bulls For Breeding Act 1985
No. 14/1985 – Social Welfare (No. 2) Act 1985
No. 15/1985 – Transport Act 1985
No. 16/1985 – Designated Investment Funds Act 1985
No. 17/1985 – Farm Tax Act 1985
No. 18/1985 – Nurses Act 1985
No. 19/1985 – European Communities (Amendment) (No. 2) Act 1985
No. 20/1985 – Housing Finance Agency (Amendment) Act 1985
No. 21/1985 – International Development Association (Amendment) Act 1985
No. 22/1985 – Irish Steel Limited (Amendment) Act 1985
No. 23/1985 – Courts Act 1985
No. 24/1985 – Appropriation Act 1985

1986
No. 1/1986 – Courts Act 1986
No. 2/1986 – Valuation Act 1986
No. 3/1986 – Canals Act 1986
No. 4/1986 – Air Transport Act 1986
No. 5/1986 – National Development Corporation Act 1986
No. 6/1986 – Free Ports Act 1986
No. 7/1986 – Slaughtered and Detained Animals (Compensation) Act 1986
No. 8/1986 – Social Welfare Act 1986
No. 9/1986 – Industrial Development Act 1986
No. 10/1986 – Health (Amendment) Act 1986
No. 11/1986 – National Archives Act 1986
No. 12/1986 – Electoral (Amendment) Act 1986
No. 13/1986 – Finance Act 1986
No. 14/1986 – Combat Poverty Agency Act 1986
No. 15/1986 – Dublin Transport Authority Act 1986
No. 16/1986 – Road Transport Act 1986
No. 17/1986 – Chester Beatty Library Act 1986
No. 18/1986 – Air Navigation and Transport (Preinspection) Act 1986
No. 19/1986 – Urban Renewal Act 1986
No. 20/1986 – Shannon Free Airport Development Company Limited (Amendment) Act 1986
No. 21/1986 – Local Loans Fund (Amendment) Act 1986
No. 22/1986 – British & Irish Steam Packet Company Limited (Acquisition) (Amendment) Act 1986
No. 23/1986 – Irish Nationality and Citizenship Act 1986
No. 24/1986 – Domicile and Recognition of Foreign Divorces Act 1986
No. 25/1986 – Companies (Amendment) Act 1986
No. 26/1986 – Courts (No. 2) Act 1986
No. 27/1986 – Malicious Injuries (Amendment) Act 1986
No. 28/1986 – National Lottery Act 1986
No. 29/1986 – Garda Síochána (Complaints) Act 1986
No. 30/1986 – Dublin Metropolitan Streets Commission Act 1986
No. 31/1986 – Transport (Re-Organisation of Córas Iompair Éireann) Act 1986
No. 32/1986 – Control of Dogs Act 1986
No. 33/1986 – Courts (No. 3) Act 1986
No. 34/1986 – Income Tax (Amendment) Act 1986
No. 35/1986 – Electoral (Amendment) (No. 2) Act 1986
No. 36/1986 – Building Societies (Amendment) Act 1986
No. 37/1986 – European Communities (Amendment) Act 1986
No. 38/1986 – Exchange Control (Continuance) Act 1986
No. 39/1986 – Appropriation Act 1986

1987
No. 1/1987 – Extradition (European Convention on the Suppression of Terrorism) Act 1987
No. 2/1987 – Social Welfare Act 1987
No. 3/1987 – Health (Amendment) Act 1987
No. 4/1987 – Referendum (Amendment) Act 1987
No. 5/1987 – Údarás na Gaeltachta (Amendment) Act 1987
No. 6/1987 – Air Pollution Act 1987
No. 7/1987 – Agriculture (An Chomhairle Oiliúna Talmhaíochta) Act 1987
No. 8/1987 – Defence (Amendment) Act 1987
No. 9/1987 – Gas (Amendment) Act 1987
No. 10/1987 – Finance Act 1987
No. 11/1987 – Tourist Traffic Act 1987
No. 12/1987 – Landlord and Tenant (Ground Rents) (Amendment) Act 1987
No. 13/1987 – Export Promotion (Amendment) Act 1987
No. 14/1987 – Fisheries (Amendment) Act 1987
No. 15/1987 – Labour Services Act 1987
No. 16/1987 – Urban Renewal (Amendment) Act 1987
No. 17/1987 – National Monuments (Amendment) Act 1987
No. 18/1987 – Safety, Health and Welfare (Offshore Installations) Act 1987
No. 19/1987 – Local Loans Fund (Amendment) Act 1987
No. 20/1987 – International Carriage of Perishable Foodstuffs Act 1987
No. 21/1987 – Shipping Investment Grants Act 1987
No. 22/1987 – Nítrigin Éireann Teoranta Act 1987
No. 23/1987 – Restrictive Practices (Confirmation of Order) Act 1987
No. 24/1987 – Copyright (Amendment) Act 1987
No. 25/1987 – Extradition (Amendment) Act 1987
No. 26/1987 – Status of Children Act 1987
No. 27/1987 – Transport Act 1987
No. 28/1987 – Control of Clinical Trials Act 1987
No. 29/1987 – Social Welfare (No. 2) Act 1987
No. 30/1987 – Science and Technology Act 1987
No. 31/1987 – Restrictive Practices (Amendment) Act 1987
No. 32/1987 – Fisheries (Amendment) (No. 2) Act 1987
No. 33/1987 – Appropriation Act 1987
No. 34/1987 – Dublin Transport Authority (Dissolution) Act 1987

Constitutional Amendments
Tenth Amendment of the Constitution Act 1987

1988
No. 1/1988 – Housing Finance Agency (Amendment) Act 1988
No. 2/1988 – Valuation Act 1988
No. 3/1988 – Jurisdiction of Courts and Enforcement of Judgments (European Communities) Act 1988
No. 4/1988 – B & I Line Act 1988
No. 5/1988 – International Development Association (Amendment) Act 1988
No. 6/1988 – Agricultural Credit Act 1988
No. 7/1988 – Social Welfare Act 1988
No. 8/1988 – Abattoirs Act 1988
No. 9/1988 – Maritime Jurisdiction (Amendment) Act 1988
No. 10/1988 – Customs and Excise (Miscellaneous Provisions) Act 1988
No. 11/1988 – Oil Pollution of the Sea (Civil Liability and Compensation) Act 1988
No. 12/1988 – Finance Act 1988
No. 13/1988 – Worker Participation (State Enterprises) Act 1988
No. 14/1988 – Courts Act 1988
No. 15/1988 – Air Navigation and Transport Act 1988
No. 16/1988 – Intoxicating Liquor Act 1988
No. 17/1988 – Electricity (Supply) (Amendment) Act 1988
No. 18/1988 – Agriculture (Research, Training and Advice) Act 1988
No. 19/1988 – Broadcasting and Wireless Telegraphy Act 1988
No. 20/1988 – Radio and Television Act 1988
No. 21/1988 – European Communities (Funding) Act 1988
No. 22/1988 – Insurance (Export Guarantees) Act 1988
No. 23/1988 – Córas Beostoic agus Feola (Amendment) Act 1988
No. 24/1988 – Tobacco (Health Promotion and Protection) Act 1988
No. 25/1988 – Data Protection Act 1988
No. 26/1988 – Forestry Act 1988
No. 27/1988 – Bankruptcy Act 1988
No. 28/1988 – Housing Act 1988
No. 29/1988 – Local Government (Multi-Storey Buildings) Act 1988
No. 30/1988 – Adoption Act 1988
No. 31/1988 – Family Law Act 1988
No. 32/1988 – Multilateral Investment Guarantee Agency Act 1988
No. 33/1988 – Irish Sailors and Soldiers Land Trust Act 1988
No. 34/1988 – Courts (No. 2) Act 1988
No. 35/1988 – Appropriation Act 1988

1989
No. 1/1989 – Garda Síochána Act 1989
No. 2/1989 – Landlord and Tenant (Amendment) Act 1989
No. 3/1989 – Insurance Act 1989
No. 4/1989 – Social Welfare Act 1989
No. 5/1989 – Jurisdiction of Courts (Maritime Conventions) Act 1989
No. 6/1989 – Judicial Separation and Family Law Reform Act 1989
No. 7/1989 – Safety, Health and Welfare At Work Act 1989
No. 8/1989 – Electoral (Amendment) Act 1989
No. 9/1989 – Bord na gCapall (Dissolution) Act 1989
No. 10/1989 – Finance Act 1989
No. 11/1989 – An Blascaod Mór National Historic Park Act 1989
No. 12/1989 – Social Welfare (No. 2) Act 1989
No. 13/1989 – Shannon Free Airport Development Company Limited (Amendment) Act 1989
No. 14/1989 – University of Limerick Act 1989
No. 15/1989 – Dublin City University Act 1989
No. 16/1989 – Central Bank Act 1989
No. 17/1989 – Building Societies Act 1989
No. 18/1989 – Children Act 1989
No. 19/1989 – Prohibition of Incitement To Hatred Act 1989
No. 20/1989 – Údarás na Gaeltachta (Amendment) Act 1989
No. 21/1989 – Trustee Savings Banks Act 1989
No. 22/1989 – Video Recordings Act 1989
No. 23/1989 – Appropriation Act 1989

Private Acts
No. 1/1989 – Local Government Provisional Order Confirmation Act 1989

1990–1999

1990
No. 1/1990 – Bord Glas Act 1990
No. 2/1990 – Decimal Currency Act 1990
No. 3/1990 – Building Control Act 1990
No. 4/1990 – B & I Line Act 1990
No. 5/1990 – Social Welfare Act 1990
No. 6/1990 – Defence (Amendment) Act 1990
No. 7/1990 – Dún Laoghaire Harbour Act 1990
No. 8/1990 – Horse Breeding Act 1990
No. 9/1990 – Larceny Act 1990
No. 10/1990 – Finance Act 1990
No. 11/1990 – Local Government (Planning and Development) Act 1990
No. 12/1990 – Firearms and Offensive Weapons Act 1990
No. 13/1990 – International Carriage of Goods by Road Act 1990
No. 14/1990 – Derelict Sites Act 1990
No. 15/1990 – Industrial Credit (Amendment) Act 1990
No. 16/1990 – Criminal Justice Act 1990
No. 17/1990 – Control of Clinical Trials and Drugs Act 1990
No. 18/1990 – National Treasury Management Agency Act 1990
No. 19/1990 – Industrial Relations Act 1990
No. 20/1990 – Shannon Navigation Act 1990
No. 21/1990 – Local Government (Water Pollution) (Amendment) Act 1990
No. 22/1990 – Turf Development Act 1990
No. 23/1990 – Health (Nursing Homes) Act 1990
No. 24/1990 – Broadcasting Act 1990
No. 25/1990 – Pensions Act 1990
No. 26/1990 – Insurance Act 1990
No. 27/1990 – Companies (Amendment) Act 1990
No. 28/1990 – Teachers' Superannuation (Amendment) Act 1990
No. 29/1990 – International Development Association (Amendment) Act 1990
No. 30/1990 – Public Hospitals (Amendment) Act 1990
No. 31/1990 – Fóir Teoranta (Dissolution) Act 1990
No. 32/1990 – Criminal Law (Rape) (Amendment) Act 1990
No. 33/1990 – Companies Act 1990
No. 34/1990 – Criminal Justice (Forensic Evidence) Act 1990
No. 35/1990 – Exchange Control (Continuance) Act 1990
No. 36/1990 – Electoral (Amendment) Act 1990
No. 37/1990 – Unit Trusts Act 1990
No. 38/1990 – Appropriation Act 1990

1991
No. 1/1991 – European Bank For Reconstruction and Development Act 1991
No. 2/1991 – Marine Institute Act 1991
No. 3/1991 – Sugar Act 1991
No. 4/1991 – Destructive Insects and Pests (Amendment) Act 1991
No. 5/1991 – Worker Protection (Regular Part-Time Employees) Act 1991
No. 6/1991 – Child Abduction and Enforcement of Custody Orders Act 1991
No. 7/1991 – Social Welfare Act 1991
No. 8/1991 – Contractual Obligations (Applicable Law) Act 1991
No. 9/1991 – Radiological Protection Act 1991
No. 10/1991 – Presidential Establishment (Amendment) Act 1991
No. 11/1991 – Local Government Act 1991
No. 12/1991 – Educational Exchange (Ireland and the United States of America) Act 1991
No. 13/1991 – Finance Act 1991
No. 14/1991 – Adoption Act 1991
No. 15/1991 – Health (Amendment) Act 1991
No. 16/1991 – University of Limerick (Dissolution of Thomond College) Act 1991
No. 17/1991 – Child Care Act 1991
No. 18/1991 – Statute of Limitations (Amendment) Act 1991
No. 19/1991 – Temple Bar Area Renewal and Development Act 1991
No. 20/1991 – Courts Act 1991
No. 21/1991 – Courts (No. 2) Act 1991
No. 22/1991 – Trade and Marketing Promotion Act 1991
No. 23/1991 – Courts (Supplemental Provisions) (Amendment) Act 1991
No. 24/1991 – Competition Act 1991
No. 25/1991 – Payment of Wages Act 1991
No. 26/1991 – Fisheries (Amendment) Act 1991
No. 27/1991 – Sea Pollution Act 1991
No. 28/1991 – Liability for Defective Products Act 1991
No. 29/1991 – B & I Line Act 1991
No. 30/1991 – Industrial Development (Amendment) Act 1991
No. 31/1991 – Criminal Damage Act 1991
No. 32/1991 – Appropriation Act 1991

1992
No. 1/1992 – Patents Act 1992
No. 2/1992 – Merchant Shipping Act 1992
No. 3/1992 – Oireachtas (Allowances To Members) and Ministerial and Parliamentary Offices (Amendment) Act 1992
No. 4/1992 – Land Bond Act 1992
No. 5/1992 – Social Welfare Act 1992
No. 6/1992 – Acc Bank Act 1992
No. 7/1992 – Environmental Protection Agency Act 1992
No. 8/1992 – Referendum (Amendment) Act 1992
No. 9/1992 – Finance Act 1992
No. 10/1992 – Fishery Harbour Centres (Amendment) Act 1992
No. 11/1992 – Financial Transactions of Certain Companies and Other Bodies Act 1992
No. 12/1992 – Criminal Evidence Act 1992
No. 13/1992 – Control of Dogs (Amendment) Act 1992
No. 14/1992 – Local Government (Planning and Development) Act 1992
No. 15/1992 – Dublin Institute of Technology Act 1992
No. 16/1992 – Regional Technical Colleges Act 1992
No. 17/1992 – Foreshore (Amendment) Act 1992
No. 18/1992 – Housing (Miscellaneous Provisions) Act 1992
No. 19/1992 – Local Authorities (Higher Education Grants) Act 1992
No. 20/1992 – Health (Family Planning) (Amendment) Act 1992
No. 21/1992 – ICC Bank Act 1992
No. 22/1992 – Referendum (Amendment) (No. 2) Act 1992
No. 23/1992 – Electoral Act 1992
No. 24/1992 – European Communities (Amendment) Act 1992
No. 25/1992 – Irish Land Commission (Dissolution) Act 1992
No. 26/1992 – Appropriation Act 1992
No. 27/1992 – Financial Transfers Act 1992
No. 28/1992 – Finance (No. 2) Act 1992
No. 29/1992 – Censorship of Films (Amendment) Act 1992

Private Acts
No. 1/1992 – Limerick Markets Act 1992

Constitutional Amendments
Eleventh Amendment of the Constitution Act 1992
Thirteenth Amendment of the Constitution Act 1992
Fourteenth Amendment of the Constitution Act 1992

1993
No. 1/1993 – State Authorities (Development and Management) Act 1993
No. 2/1993 – Údarás na Gaeltachta (Amendment) Act 1993
No. 3/1993 – Nítrigin Éireann Teoranta Act 1993
No. 4/1993 – National Stud (Amendment) Act 1993
No. 5/1993 – Social Welfare Act 1993
No. 6/1993 – Criminal Justice Act 1993
No. 7/1993 – Gas (Amendment) Act 1993
No. 8/1993 – Comptroller and Auditor General (Amendment) Act 1993
No. 9/1993 – Jurisdiction of Courts and Enforcement of Judgments Act 1993
No. 10/1993 – Interception of Postal Packets and Telecommunications Messages (Regulation) Act 1993
No. 11/1993 – Criminal Law (Suicide) Act 1993
No. 12/1993 – Local Government (Planning and Development) Act 1993
No. 13/1993 – Finance Act 1993
No. 14/1993 – Roads Act 1993
No. 15/1993 – Broadcasting Authority (Amendment) Act 1993
No. 16/1993 – Health (Family Planning) (Amendment) Act 1993
No. 17/1993 – Medical Practitioners (Amendment) Act 1993
No. 18/1993 – Defence (Amendment) Act 1993
No. 19/1993 – Industrial Development Act 1993
No. 20/1993 – Criminal Law (Sexual Offences) Act 1993
No. 21/1993 – Statistics Act 1993
No. 22/1993 – Unfair Dismissals (Amendment) Act 1993
No. 23/1993 – Animal Remedies Act 1993
No. 24/1993 – Waiver of Certain Tax, Interest and Penalties Act 1993
No. 25/1993 – European Communities (Amendment) Act 1993
No. 26/1993 – International Development Association (Amendment) Act 1993
No. 27/1993 – Social Welfare (Consolidation) Act 1993
No. 28/1993 – Presidential Elections Act 1993
No. 29/1993 – Irish Aviation Authority Act 1993
No. 30/1993 – European Parliament Elections Act 1993
No. 31/1993 – Local Government (Dublin) Act 1993
No. 32/1993 – Social Welfare (No. 2) Act 1993
No. 33/1993 – Diplomatic and Consular Officers (Provision of Services) Act 1993
No. 34/1993 – Merchant Shipping (Salvage and Wreck) Act 1993
No. 35/1993 – Interpretation (Amendment) Act 1993
No. 36/1993 – Irish Film Board (Amendment) Act 1993
No. 37/1993 – Greyhound Industry (Amendment) Act 1993
No. 38/1993 – Air Companies (Amendment) Act 1993
No. 39/1993 – Appropriation Act 1993
No. 40/1993 – Criminal Procedure Act 1993

Private Acts
No. 1/1993 – The Altamont (Amendment of Deed of Trust) Act 1993

1994
No. 1/1994 – Stillbirths Registration Act 1994
No. 2/1994 – Criminal Justice (Public Order) Act 1994
No. 3/1994 – Industrial Training (Apprenticeship Levy) Act 1994
No. 4/1994 – Social Welfare Act 1994
No. 5/1994 – Terms of Employment (Information) Act 1994
No. 6/1994 – Extradition (Amendment) Act 1994
No. 7/1994 – Road Traffic Act 1994
No. 8/1994 – Local Government Act 1994
No. 9/1994 – Irish Nationality and Citizenship Act 1994
No. 10/1994 – Irish Shipping Limited (Payments To Former Employees) Act 1994
No. 11/1994 – Health (Amendment) Act 1994
No. 12/1994 – Referendum Act 1994
No. 13/1994 – Finance Act 1994
No. 14/1994 – Trade and Marketing Promotion (Amendment) Act 1994
No. 15/1994 – Criminal Justice Act 1994
No. 16/1994 – Health Insurance Act 1994
No. 17/1994 – National Monuments (Amendment) Act 1994
No. 18/1994 – Irish Horseracing Industry Act 1994
No. 19/1994 – Dún Laoghaire Harbour Act 1994
No. 20/1994 – Landlord and Tenant (Amendment) Act 1994
No. 21/1994 – Oireachtas (Allowances To Members) (Amendment) Act 1994
No. 22/1994 – An Bord Bia Act 1994
No. 23/1994 – Fisheries (Amendment) Act 1994
No. 24/1994 – Investment Limited Partnerships Act 1994
No. 25/1994 – Milk (Regulation of Supply) Act 1994
No. 26/1994 – Acc Bank Act 1994
No. 27/1994 – Solicitors (Amendment) Act 1994
No. 28/1994 – Maintenance Act 1994
No. 29/1994 – Regional Technical Colleges (Amendment) Act 1994
No. 30/1994 – European Communities (Amendment) Act 1994
No. 31/1994 – Dublin Institute of Technology (Amendment) Act 1994
No. 32/1994 – Select Committee on Legislation and Security of Dáil Éireann (Privilege and Immunity) Act 1994
No. 33/1994 – Appropriation Act 1994
No. 34/1994 – Maternity Protection Act 1994

1995
No. 1/1995 – Ministers and Secretaries (Amendment) Act 1995
No. 2/1995 – Adoptive Leave Act 1995
No. 3/1995 – Social Welfare Act 1995
No. 4/1995 – Heritage Act 1995
No. 5/1995 – Regulation of Information (Services Outside the State For Termination of Pregnancies) Act 1995
No. 6/1995 – European Communities (Amendment) Act 1995
No. 7/1995 – Road Traffic Act 1995
No. 8/1995 – Finance Act 1995
No. 9/1995 – Stock Exchange Act 1995
No. 10/1995 – Occupiers' Liability Act 1995
No. 11/1995 – Investment Intermediaries Act 1995
No. 12/1995 – Criminal Law (Incest Proceedings) Act 1995
No. 13/1995 – Tourist Traffic Act 1995
No. 14/1995 – Arterial Drainage (Amendment) Act 1995
No. 15/1995 – Minerals Development Act 1995
No. 16/1995 – Transfer of Sentenced Persons Act 1995
No. 17/1995 – Package Holidays and Travel Trade Act 1995
No. 18/1995 – Local Government (Delimitation of Water Supply Disconnection Powers) Act 1995
No. 19/1995 – Casual Trading Act 1995
No. 20/1995 – An Bord Bia (Amendment) Act 1995
No. 21/1995 – Electoral (Amendment) Act 1995
No. 22/1995 – Ethics in Public Office Act 1995
No. 23/1995 – Social Welfare (No. 2) Act 1995
No. 24/1995 – Consumer Credit Act 1995
No. 25/1995 – Netting of Financial Contracts Act 1995
No. 26/1995 – Family Law Act 1995
No. 27/1995 – Fisheries (Amendment) Act 1995
No. 28/1995 – Industrial Development Act 1995
No. 29/1995 – Irish Medicines Board Act 1995
No. 30/1995 – Securitisation (Proceeds of Certain Mortgages) Act 1995
No. 31/1995 – Courts and Court Officers Act 1995
No. 32/1995 – Civil Legal Aid Act 1995
No. 33/1995 – Intoxicating Liquor Act 1995
No. 34/1995 – Appropriation Act 1995
No. 35/1995 – Energy (Miscellaneous Provisions) Act 1995
No. 36/1995 – Milk (Regulation of Supply) (Amendment) Act 1995

Constitutional Amendments
Fifteenth Amendment of the Constitution Act 1995

1996
No. 1/1996 – Domestic Violence Act 1996
No. 2/1996 – Johnstown Castle Agricultural College (Amendment) Act 1996
No. 3/1996 – Commissioners of Public Works (Functions and Powers) Act 1996
No. 4/1996 – Voluntary Health Insurance (Amendment) Act 1996
No. 5/1996 – Bovine Diseases (Levies) (Amendment) Act 1996
No. 6/1996 – Trade Marks Act 1996
No. 7/1996 – Social Welfare Act 1996
No. 8/1996 – Irish Steel Limited Act 1996
No. 9/1996 – Finance Act 1996
No. 10/1996 – Waste Management Act 1996
No. 11/1996 – Harbours Act 1996
No. 12/1996 – Powers of Attorney Act 1996
No. 13/1996 – Civil Service Regulation (Amendment) Act 1996
No. 14/1996 – Dumping At Sea Act 1996
No. 15/1996 – Health (Amendment) Act 1996
No. 16/1996 – Protection of Young Persons (Employment) Act 1996
No. 17/1996 – Refugee Act 1996
No. 18/1996 – Pensions (Amendment) Act 1996
No. 19/1996 – Competition (Amendment) Act 1996
No. 20/1996 – Transnational Information and Consultation of Employees Act 1996
No. 21/1996 – An Bord Bia (Amendment) Act 1996
No. 22/1996 – Borrowing Powers of Certain Bodies Act 1996
No. 23/1996 – Health (Amendment) (No. 2) Act 1996
No. 24/1996 – Transport (Dublin Light Rail) Act 1996
No. 25/1996 – Disclosure of Certain Information For Taxation and Other Purposes Act 1996
No. 26/1996 – Courts Act 1996
No. 27/1996 – Metrology Act 1996
No. 28/1996 – National Standards Authority of Ireland Act 1996
No. 29/1996 – Criminal Justice (Drug Trafficking) Act 1996
No. 30/1996 – Proceeds of Crime Act 1996
No. 31/1996 – Criminal Assets Bureau Act 1996
No. 32/1996 – Health (Amendment) (No. 3) Act 1996
No. 33/1996 – Family Law (Divorce) Act 1996
No. 34/1996 – Telecommunications (Miscellaneous Provisions) Act 1996
No. 35/1996 – Merchant Shipping (Liability of Shipowners and Others) Act 1996
No. 36/1996 – Registration of Births Act 1996
No. 37/1996 – Control of Horses Act 1996
No. 38/1996 – Sexual Offences (Jurisdiction) Act 1996
No. 39/1996 – Oireachtas (Miscellaneous Provisions) and Ministerial and Parliamentary Offices (Amendment) Act 1996
No. 40/1996 – Appropriation Act 1996
No. 41/1996 – Milk (Regulation of Supply) (Amendment) Act 1996
No. 42/1996 – Civil Liability (Amendment) Act 1996
No. 43/1996 – Electoral (Amendment) Act 1996

Constitutional Amendments
Sixteenth Amendment of the Constitution Act 1996

1997
No. 1/1997 – Fisheries (Commissions) Act 1997
No. 2/1997 – European Parliament Elections Act 1997
No. 3/1997 – Decommissioning Act 1997
No. 4/1997 – Criminal Justice (Miscellaneous Provisions) Act 1997
No. 5/1997 – Irish Takeover Panel Act 1997
No. 6/1997 – Courts Act 1997
No. 7/1997 – Dublin Docklands Development Authority Act 1997
No. 8/1997 – Central Bank Act 1997
No. 9/1997 – Health (Provision of Information) Act 1997
No. 10/1997 – Social Welfare Act 1997
No. 11/1997 – National Cultural Institutions Act 1997
No. 12/1997 – Litter Pollution Act 1997
No. 13/1997 – Freedom of Information Act 1997
No. 14/1997 – Criminal Law Act 1997
No. 15/1997 – Credit Union Act 1997
No. 16/1997 – Bail Act 1997
No. 17/1997 – Committees of the Houses of the Oireachtas (Compellability, Privileges and Immunities of Witnesses) Act 1997
No. 18/1997 – Family Law (Miscellaneous Provisions) Act 1997
No. 19/1997 – International Development Association (Amendment) Act 1997
No. 20/1997 – Organisation of Working Time Act 1997
No. 21/1997 – Housing (Miscellaneous Provisions) Act 1997
No. 22/1997 – Finance Act 1997
No. 23/1997 – Fisheries (Amendment) Act 1997
No. 24/1997 – Universities Act 1997
No. 25/1997 – Electoral Act 1997
No. 26/1997 – Non-Fatal Offences Against the Person Act 1997
No. 27/1997 – Public Service Management Act 1997
No. 28/1997 – Chemical Weapons Act 1997
No. 29/1997 – Local Government (Financial Provisions) Act 1997
No. 30/1997 – Youth Work Act 1997
No. 31/1997 – Prompt Payment of Accounts Act 1997
No. 32/1997 – ICC Bank (Amendment) Act 1997
No. 33/1997 – Licensing (Combating Drug Abuse) Act 1997
No. 34/1997 – Hepatitis C Compensation Tribunal Act 1997
No. 35/1997 – Registration of Title (Amendment) Act 1997
No. 36/1997 – Interpretation (Amendment) Act 1997
No. 37/1997 – Merchant Shipping (Commissioners of Irish Lights) Act 1997
No. 38/1997 – Europol Act 1997
No. 39/1997 – Taxes Consolidation Act 1997
No. 40/1997 – Children Act 1997
No. 41/1997 – Transfer of Sentenced Persons (Amendment) Act 1997
No. 42/1997 – Tribunals of Inquiry (Evidence) (Amendment) Act 1997
No. 43/1997 – Courts (No. 2) Act 1997
No. 44/1997 – Irish Film Board (Amendment) Act 1997
No. 45/1997 – Appropriation Act 1997
No. 46/1997 – Scientific and Technological Education (Investment) Fund Act 1997

Constitutional Amendments
Seventeenth Amendment of the Constitution Act 1997

1998
No. 1/1998 – Referendum Act 1998
No. 2/1998 – Central Bank Act 1998
No. 3/1998 – Finance Act 1998
No. 4/1998 – Electoral (Amendment) Act 1998
No. 5/1998 – Oireachtas (Allowances To Members) and Ministerial, Parliamentary, Judicial and Court Offices (Amendment) Act 1998
No. 6/1998 – Social Welfare Act 1998
No. 7/1998 – Minister For Arts, Heritage, Gaeltacht and the Islands (Powers and Functions) Act 1998
No. 8/1998 – Courts Service Act 1998
No. 9/1998 – Local Government (Planning and Development) Act 1998
No. 10/1998 – Adoption Act 1998
No. 11/1998 – Tribunals of Inquiry (Evidence) (Amendment) Act 1998
No. 12/1998 – Civil Liability (Assessment of Hearing Injury) Act 1998
No. 13/1998 – Oil Pollution of the Sea (Civil Liability and Compensation) (Amendment) Act 1998
No. 14/1998 – Arbitration (International Commercial) Act 1998
No. 15/1998 – Finance (No. 2) Act 1998
No. 16/1998 – Local Government Act 1998
No. 17/1998 – Gas (Amendment) Act 1998
No. 18/1998 – Tribunals of Inquiry (Evidence) (Amendment) (No. 2) Act 1998
No. 19/1998 – Electoral (Amendment) (No. 2) Act 1998
No. 20/1998 – Merchant Shipping (Miscellaneous Provisions) Act 1998
No. 21/1998 – Employment Equality Act 1998
No. 22/1998 – Child Trafficking and Pornography Act 1998
No. 23/1998 – Roads (Amendment) Act 1998
No. 24/1998 – Air Navigation and Transport (Amendment) Act 1998
No. 25/1998 – European Communities (Amendment) Act 1998
No. 26/1998 – Turf Development Act 1998
No. 27/1998 – Urban Renewal Act 1998
No. 28/1998 – Intellectual Property (Miscellaneous Provisions) Act 1998
No. 29/1998 – Food Safety Authority of Ireland Act 1998
No. 30/1998 – Parental Leave Act 1998
No. 31/1998 – Defence (Amendment) Act 1998
No. 32/1998 – Firearms (Temporary Provisions) Act 1998
No. 33/1998 – Housing (Traveller Accommodation) Act 1998
No. 34/1998 – Industrial Development (Enterprise Ireland) Act 1998
No. 35/1998 – Geneva Conventions (Amendment) Act 1998
No. 36/1998 – Criminal Justice (Release of Prisoners) Act 1998
No. 37/1998 – Investor Compensation Act 1998
No. 38/1998 – Economic and Monetary Union Act 1998
No. 39/1998 – Offences Against the State (Amendment) Act 1998
No. 40/1998 – International War Crimes Tribunals Act 1998
No. 41/1998 – Plant Varieties (Proprietary Rights) (Amendment) Act 1998
No. 42/1998 – Western Development Commission Act 1998
No. 43/1998 – Carriage of Dangerous Goods by Road Act 1998
No. 44/1998 – State Property Act 1998
No. 45/1998 – Tourist Traffic Act 1998
No. 46/1998 – Voluntary Health Insurance (Amendment) Act 1998
No. 47/1998 – Comptroller and Auditor General and Committees of the Houses of the Oireachtas (Special Provisions) Act 1998
No. 48/1998 – Appropriation Act 1998
No. 49/1998 – Protections For Persons Reporting Child Abuse Act 1998
No. 50/1998 – George Mitchell Scholarship Fund Act 1998
No. 51/1998 – Education Act 1998
No. 52/1998 – Jurisdiction of Courts and Enforcement of Judgments Act 1998
No. 53/1998 – Scientific and Technological Education (Investment) Fund (Amendment) Act 1998
No. 54/1998 – Fisheries and Foreshore (Amendment) Act 1998

Constitutional Amendments
Eighteenth Amendment of the Constitution Act 1998
Nineteenth Amendment of the Constitution Act 1998

1999
No. 1/1999 – British-Irish Agreement Act 1999
No. 2/1999 – Finance Act 1999
No. 3/1999 – Social Welfare Act 1999
No. 4/1999 – Bretton Woods Agreements (Amendment) Act 1999
No. 5/1999 – Postal and Telecommunications Services (Amendment) Act 1999
No. 6/1999 – Irish Sports Council Act 1999
No. 7/1999 – Local Elections (Disclosure of Donations and Expenditure) Act 1999
No. 8/1999 – Companies (Amendment) Act 1999
No. 9/1999 – Criminal Justice (Location of Victims' Remains) Act 1999
No. 10/1999 – Criminal Justice Act 1999
No. 11/1999 – Údarás na Gaeltachta (Amendment) Act 1999
No. 12/1999 – Declaration under Article 29.7 of the Constitution (Extension of Time) Act 1999
No. 13/1999 – Health (Eastern Regional Health Authority) Act 1999
No. 14/1999 – National Disability Authority Act 1999
No. 15/1999 – Road Transport Act 1999
No. 16/1999 – British-Irish Agreement (Amendment) Act 1999
No. 17/1999 – Local Government (Planning and Development) Act 1999
No. 18/1999 – Sea Pollution (Amendment) Act 1999
No. 19/1999 – Architectural Heritage (National Inventory) and Historic Monuments (Miscellaneous Provisions) Act 1999
No. 20/1999 – Regional Technical Colleges (Amendment) Act 1999
No. 21/1999 – Minerals Development Act 1999
No. 22/1999 – Immigration Act 1999
No. 23/1999 – Electricity Regulation Act 1999
No. 24/1999 – Horse and Greyhound Racing (Betting Charges and Levies) Act 1999
No. 25/1999 – Courts (Supplemental Provisions) (Amendment) Act 1999
No. 26/1999 – Qualifications (Education and Training) Act 1999
No. 27/1999 – Údarás na Gaeltachta (Amendment) (No. 2) Act 1999
No. 28/1999 – Broadcasting (Major Events Television Coverage) Act 1999
No. 29/1999 – ICC Bank Act 1999
No. 30/1999 – Companies (Amendment) (No. 2) Act 1999
No. 31/1999 – Stamp Duties Consolidation Act 1999
No. 32/1999 – Intoxicating Liquor Act 1999
No. 33/1999 – Temporary Holding Fund for Superannuation Liabilities Act 1999
No. 34/1999 – Appropriation Act 1999
No. 35/1999 – Fisheries (Amendment) Act 1999

Constitutional Amendments
Twentieth Amendment of the Constitution Act 1999

2000–2009

2000
No. 1/2000 – Comhairle Act 2000
No. 2/2000 – National Beef Assurance Scheme Act 2000
No. 3/2000 – Finance Act 2000
No. 4/2000 – Social Welfare Act 2000
No. 5/2000 – National Minimum Wage Act 2000
No. 6/2000 – Local Government (Financial Provisions) Act 2000
No. 7/2000 – Commission To Inquire Into Child Abuse Act 2000
No. 8/2000 – Equal Status Act 2000
No. 9/2000 – Human Rights Commission Act 2000
No. 10/2000 – Multilateral Investment Guarantee Agency (Amendment) Act 2000
No. 11/2000 – Criminal Justice (United Nations Convention Against Torture) Act 2000
No. 12/2000 – International Development Association (Amendment) Act 2000
No. 13/2000 – Statute of Limitations (Amendment) Act 2000
No. 14/2000 – Merchant Shipping (Investigation of Marine Casualties) Act 2000
No. 15/2000 – Courts (Supplemental Provisions) (Amendment) Act 2000
No. 16/2000 – Criminal Justice (Safety of United Nations Workers) Act 2000
No. 17/2000 – Intoxicating Liquor Act 2000
No. 18/2000 – Town Renewal Act 2000
No. 19/2000 – Finance (No. 2) Act 2000
No. 20/2000 – Firearms (Firearm Certificates For Non-Residents) Act 2000
No. 21/2000 – Harbours (Amendment) Act 2000
No. 22/2000 – Education (Welfare) Act 2000
No. 23/2000 – Hospitals' Trust (1940) Limited (Payments To Former Employees) Act 2000
No. 24/2000 – Medical Practitioners (Amendment) Act 2000
No. 25/2000 – Local Government Act 2000
No. 26/2000 – Gas (Amendment) Act 2000
No. 27/2000 – Electronic Commerce Act 2000
No. 28/2000 – Copyright and Related Rights Act 2000
No. 29/2000 – Illegal Immigrants (Trafficking) Act 2000
No. 30/2000 – Planning and Development Act 2000
No. 31/2000 – Cement (Repeal of Enactments) Act 2000
No. 32/2000 – ICC Bank Act 2000
No. 33/2000 – National Pensions Reserve Fund Act 2000
No. 34/2000 – Fisheries (Amendment) Act 2000
No. 35/2000 – Irish Film Board (Amendment) Act 2000
No. 36/2000 – Appropriation Act 2000
No. 37/2000 – Protection of Children (Hague Convention) Act 2000
No. 38/2000 – Wildlife (Amendment) Act 2000
No. 39/2000 – National Treasury Management Agency (Amendment) Act 2000
No. 40/2000 – National Stud (Amendment) Act 2000
No. 41/2000 – National Training Fund Act 2000
No. 42/2000 – Insurance Act 2000

Private Acts
No. 1/2000 – The Trinity College, Dublin (Charters and Letters Patent Amendment) Act 2000

2001
No. 1/2001 – Aviation Regulation Act 2001
No. 2/2001 – Customs and Excise (Mutual Assistance) Act 2001
No. 3/2001 – Diseases of Animals (Amendment) Act 2001
No. 4/2001 – Broadcasting Act 2001
No. 5/2001 – Social Welfare Act 2001
No. 6/2001 – Trustee Savings Banks (Amendment) Act 2001
No. 7/2001 – Finance Act 2001
No. 8/2001 – Teaching Council Act 2001
No. 9/2001 – Electricity (Supply) (Amendment) Act 2001
No. 10/2001 – Housing (Gaeltacht) (Amendment) Act 2001
No. 11/2001 – Industrial Relations (Amendment) Act 2001
No. 12/2001 – Acc Bank Act 2001
No. 13/2001 – Valuation Act 2001
No. 14/2001 – Health (Miscellaneous Provisions) Act 2001
No. 15/2001 – Irish Nationality and Citizenship Act 2001
No. 16/2001 – Euro Changeover (Amounts) Act 2001
No. 17/2001 – Health Insurance (Amendment) Act 2001
No. 18/2001 – Sex Offenders Act 2001
No. 19/2001 – Carer's Leave Act 2001
No. 20/2001 – Horse and Greyhound Racing Act 2001
No. 21/2001 – Nítrigin Éireann Teoranta Act 2001
No. 22/2001 – Motor Vehicle (Duties and Licences) Act 2001
No. 23/2001 – Vocational Education (Amendment) Act 2001
No. 24/2001 – Children Act 2001
No. 25/2001 – Mental Health Act 2001
No. 26/2001 – Irish National Petroleum Corporation Limited Act 2001
No. 27/2001 – Prevention of Corruption (Amendment) Act 2001
No. 28/2001 – Company Law Enforcement Act 2001
No. 29/2001 – Agriculture Appeals Act 2001
No. 30/2001 – Oireachtas (Ministerial and Parliamentary Offices) (Amendment) Act 2001
No. 31/2001 – Standards in Public Office Act 2001
No. 32/2001 – Dormant Accounts Act 2001
No. 33/2001 – Ministerial, Parliamentary and Judicial Offices and Oireachtas Members (Miscellaneous Provisions) Act 2001
No. 34/2001 – Adventure Activities Standards Authority Act 2001
No. 35/2001 – Human Rights Commission (Amendment) Act 2001
No. 36/2001 – Waste Management (Amendment) Act 2001
No. 37/2001 – Local Government Act 2001
No. 38/2001 – Electoral (Amendment) Act 2001
No. 39/2001 – Industrial Designs Act 2001
No. 40/2001 – Fisheries (Amendment) Act 2001
No. 41/2001 – European Communities and Swiss Confederation Act 2001
No. 42/2001 – Youth Work Act 2001
No. 43/2001 – Ordnance Survey Ireland Act 2001
No. 44/2001 – Heritage Fund Act 2001
No. 45/2001 – Protection of Employees (Part-Time Work) Act 2001
No. 46/2001 – Horse Racing Ireland (Membership) Act 2001
No. 47/2001 – Asset Covered Securities Act 2001
No. 48/2001 – Air Navigation and Transport (Indemnities) Act 2001
No. 49/2001 – Extradition (European Union Conventions) Act 2001
No. 50/2001 – Criminal Justice (Theft and Fraud Offences) Act 2001
No. 51/2001 – Social Welfare (No. 2) Act 2001
No. 52/2001 – Appropriation Act 2001
No. 53/2001 – Referendum Act 2001
No. 54/2001 – Family Support Agency Act 2001
No. 55/2001 – Transport (Railway Infrastructure) Act 2001

Constitutional Amendments
Twenty-first Amendment of the Constitution Act 2001
Twenty-third Amendment of the Constitution Act 2001

2002
No. 1/2002 – State Authorities (Public Private Partnership Arrangements) Act 2002
No. 2/2002 – Sustainable Energy Act 2002
No. 3/2002 – Radiological Protection (Amendment) Act 2002
No. 4/2002 – Electoral (Amendment) Act 2002
No. 5/2002 – Finance Act 2002
No. 6/2002 – Public Health (Tobacco) Act 2002
No. 7/2002 – Tribunals of Inquiry (Evidence) (Amendment) Act 2002
No. 8/2002 – Social Welfare (Miscellaneous Provisions) Act 2002
No. 9/2002 – Housing (Miscellaneous Provisions) Act 2002
No. 10/2002 – Gas (Interim) (Regulation) Act 2002
No. 11/2002 – Arramara Teoranta (Acquisition of Shares) Act 2002
No. 12/2002 – Road Traffic Act 2002
No. 13/2002 – Residential Institutions Redress Act 2002
No. 14/2002 – Competition Act 2002
No. 15/2002 – Courts and Court Officers Act 2002
No. 16/2002 – Civil Defence Act 2002
No. 17/2002 – Medical Practitioners (Amendment) Act 2002
No. 18/2002 – Pensions (Amendment) Act 2002
No. 19/2002 – Solicitors (Amendment) Act 2002
No. 20/2002 – Communications Regulation Act 2002
No. 21/2002 – Hepatitis C Compensation Tribunal (Amendment) Act 2002
No. 22/2002 – Ombudsman For Children Act 2002
No. 23/2002 – Electoral (Amendment) (No. 2) Act 2002
No. 24/2002 – Minister For the Environment and Local Government (Performance of Certain Functions) Act 2002
No. 25/2002 – European Union (Scrutiny) Act 2002
No. 26/2002 – British-Irish Agreement (Amendment) Act 2002
No. 27/2002 – European Communities (Amendment) Act 2002
No. 28/2002 – Appropriation Act 2002
No. 29/2002 – National Development Finance Agency Act 2002
No. 30/2002 – Domestic Violence (Amendment) Act 2002
No. 31/2002 – Social Welfare Act 2002
No. 32/2002 – Planning and Development (Amendment) Act 2002
No. 33/2002 – Statute Law (Restatement) Act 2002

Constitutional Amendments
Twenty-sixth Amendment of the Constitution Act 2002

2003
No. 1/2003 – Capital Acquisitions Tax Consolidation Act 2003
No. 2/2003 – Unclaimed Life Assurance Policies Act 2003
No. 3/2003 – Finance Act 2003
No. 4/2003 – Social Welfare (Miscellaneous Provisions) Act 2003
No. 5/2003 – Motor Vehicle (Duties and Licences) Act 2003
No. 6/2003 – Data Protection (Amendment) Act 2003
No. 7/2003 – Employment Permits Act 2003
No. 8/2003 – Local Government Act 2003
No. 9/2003 – Freedom of Information (Amendment) Act 2003
No. 10/2003 – National Tourism Development Authority Act 2003
No. 11/2003 – Health Insurance (Amendment) Act 2003
No. 12/2003 – Central Bank and Financial Services Authority of Ireland Act 2003
No. 13/2003 – Broadcasting (Major Events Television Coverage) (Amendment) Act 2003
No. 14/2003 – Redundancy Payments Act 2003
No. 15/2003 – Licensing of Indoor Events Act 2003
No. 16/2003 – Criminal Justice (Public Order) Act 2003
No. 17/2003 – Local Government (No. 2) Act 2003
No. 18/2003 – Criminal Justice (Illicit Traffic by Sea) Act 2003
No. 19/2003 – Garda Síochána (Police Co-Operation) Act 2003
No. 20/2003 – European Convention on Human Rights Act 2003
No. 21/2003 – Fisheries (Amendment) Act 2003
No. 22/2003 – Opticians (Amendment) Act 2003
No. 23/2003 – Digital Hub Development Agency Act 2003
No. 24/2003 – Arts Act 2003
No. 25/2003 – Taxi Regulation Act 2003
No. 26/2003 – Immigration Act 2003
No. 27/2003 – Protection of the Environment Act 2003
No. 28/2003 – Houses of the Oireachtas Commission Act 2003
No. 29/2003 – Protection of Employees (Fixed-Term Work) Act 2003
No. 30/2003 – Industrial Development (Science Foundation Ireland) Act 2003
No. 31/2003 – Intoxicating Liquor Act 2003
No. 32/2003 – Official Languages Act 2003
No. 33/2003 – Oil Pollution of the Sea (Civil Liability and Compensation) (Amendment) Act 2003
No. 34/2003 – Criminal Justice (Temporary Release of Prisoners) Act 2003
No. 35/2003 – Containment of Nuclear Weapons Act 2003
No. 36/2003 – Courts and Court Officers (Amendment) Act 2003
No. 37/2003 – Road Traffic Act 2003
No. 38/2003 – European Communities (Amendment) Act 2003
No. 39/2003 – Minister for Community, Rural and Gaeltacht Affairs (Powers and Functions) Act 2003
No. 40/2003 – Independent Monitoring Commission Act 2003
No. 41/2003 – Social Welfare Act 2003
No. 42/2003 – Appropriation Act 2003
No. 43/2003 – Broadcasting (Funding) Act 2003
No. 44/2003 – Companies (Auditing and Accounting) Act 2003
No. 45/2003 – European Arrest Warrant Act 2003
No. 46/2003 – Personal Injuries Assessment Board Act 2003

Private Acts
No. 1/2003 – The Royal College of Surgeons in Ireland (Charters Amendment) Act 2003

2004
No. 1/2004 – Immigration Act 2004
No. 2/2004 – European Parliament Elections (Amendment) Act 2004
No. 3/2004 – Civil Registration Act 2004
No. 4/2004 – Industrial Relations (Miscellaneous Provisions) Act 2004
No. 5/2004 – Motor Vehicle (Duties and Licences) Act 2004
No. 6/2004 – Public Health (Tobacco) (Amendment) Act 2004
No. 7/2004 – Public Service Superannuation (Miscellaneous Provisions) Act 2004
No. 8/2004 – Finance Act 2004
No. 9/2004 – Social Welfare (Miscellaneous Provisions) Act 2004
No. 10/2004 – Aer Lingus Act 2004
No. 11/2004 – Air Navigation and Transport (International Conventions) Act 2004
No. 12/2004 – Private Security Services Act 2004
No. 13/2004 – Tribunals of Inquiry (Evidence) (Amendment) Act 2004
No. 14/2004 – An Bord Bia (Amendment) Act 2004
No. 15/2004 – Electoral (Amendment) Act 2004
No. 16/2004 – Committees of the Houses of the Oireachtas (Compellability, Privileges and Immunities of Witnesses) (Amendment) Act 2004
No. 17/2004 – Child Trafficking and Pornography (Amendment) Act 2004
No. 18/2004 – Copyright and Related Rights(Amendment) Act 2004
No. 19/2004 – Health (Amendment) Act 2004
No. 20/2004 – Criminal Justice (Joint Investigation Teams) Act 2004
No. 21/2004 – Central Bank and Financial Services Authority of Ireland Act 2004
No. 22/2004 – National Monuments (Amendment) Act 2004
No. 23/2004 – Commissions of Investigation Act 2004
No. 24/2004 – Equality Act 2004
No. 25/2004 – Electricity (Supply) (Amendment) Act 2004
No. 26/2004 – International Development Association (Amendment) Act 2004
No. 27/2004 – Residential Tenancies Act 2004
No. 28/2004 – Maternity Protection (Amendment) Act 2004
No. 29/2004 – Maritime Security Act 2004
No. 30/2004 – Education for Persons with Special Educational Needs Act 2004
No. 31/2004 – Civil Liability and Courts Act 2004
No. 32/2004 – State Airports Act 2004
No. 33/2004 – Public Service Management (Recruitment and Appointments) Act 2004
No. 34/2004 – Intoxicating Liquor Act 2004
No. 35/2004 – Dumping at Sea (Amendment) Act 2004
No. 36/2004 – Ombudsman (Defence Forces) Act 2004
No. 37/2004 – Council of Europe Development Bank Act 2004
No. 38/2004 – Irish Nationality and Citizenship Act 2004
No. 39/2004 – Tribunal of Inquiry into Certain Planning Matters and Payments Act 2004
No. 40/2004 – Appropriation Act 2004
No. 41/2004 – Social Welfare Act 2004
No. 42/2004 – Health Act 2004
No. 43/2004 – Housing (Miscellaneous Provisions) Act 2004
No. 44/2004 – Road Traffic Act 2004

Constitutional Amendments
Twenty-seventh Amendment of the Constitution Act 2004

2005
No. 1/2005 – Proceeds of Crime (Amendment) Act 2005
No. 2/2005 – Criminal Justice (Terrorist Offences) Act 2005
No. 3/2005 – Health (Amendment) Act 2005
No. 4/2005 – Social Welfare and Pensions Act 2005
No. 5/2005 – Finance Act 2005
No. 6/2005 – British-Irish Agreement (Amendment) Act 2005
No. 7/2005 – Landlord and Tenant (Ground Rents) Act 2005
No. 8/2005 – Dormant Accounts (Amendment) Act 2005
No. 9/2005 – Sea Pollution (Hazardous Substances) (Compensation) Act 2005
No. 10/2005 – Safety, Health and Welfare at Work Act 2005
No. 11/2005 – Maritime Safety Act 2005
No. 12/2005 – Investment Funds, Companies and Miscellaneous Provisions Act 2005
No. 13/2005 – Air Navigation and Transport (Indemnities) Act 2005
No. 14/2005 – Disability Act 2005
No. 15/2005 – International Interests in Mobile Equipment (Cape Town Convention) Act 2005
No. 16/2005 – Electoral (Amendment) Act 2005
No. 17/2005 – Commission to Inquire into Child Abuse (Amendment) Act 2005
No. 18/2005 – Civil Service Regulation (Amendment) Act 2005
No. 19/2005 – Civil Registration (Amendment) Act 2005
No. 20/2005 – Garda Síochána Act 2005
No. 21/2005 – Grangegorman Development Agency Act 2005
No. 22/2005 – Veterinary Practice Act 2005
No. 23/2005 – Interpretation Act 2005
No. 24/2005 – Land Act 2005
No. 25/2005 – Adoptive Leave Act 2005
No. 26/2005 – Social Welfare Consolidation Act 2005
No. 27/2005 – Health and Social Care Professionals Act 2005
No. 28/2005 – Transfer of Execution of Sentences Act 2005
No. 29/2005 – Appropriation Act 2005
No. 30/2005 – Social Welfare Act 2005
No. 31/2005 – Railway Safety Act 2005
No. 32/2005 – Statute Law Revision (Pre-1922) Act 2005
No. 33/2005 – Coroners (Amendment) Act 2005
No. 34/2005 – Development Banks Act 2005

2006
No. 1/2006 – University College Galway (Amendment) Act 2006
No. 2/2006 – Teaching Council (Amendment) Act 2006
No. 3/2006 – Irish Medicines Board (Miscellaneous Provisions) Act 2006
No. 4/2006 – Competition (Amendment) Act 2006
No. 5/2006 – Social Welfare Law Reform and Pensions Act 2006
No. 6/2006 – Finance Act 2006
No. 7/2006 – Aviation Act 2006
No. 8/2006 – Sea-Fisheries and Maritime Jurisdiction Act 2006
No. 9/2006 – Employees (Provision of Information and Consultation) Act 2006
No. 10/2006 – Diplomatic Relations and Immunities (Amendment) Act 2006
No. 11/2006 – Criminal Law (Insanity) Act 2006
No. 12/2006 – Registration of Deeds and Title Act 2006
No. 13/2006 – Parental Leave (Amendment) Act 2006
No. 14/2006 – Road Safety Authority Act 2006
No. 15/2006 – Criminal Law (Sexual Offences) Act 2006
No. 16/2006 – Employment Permits Act 2006
No. 17/2006 – Health (Repayment Scheme) Act 2006
No. 18/2006 – European Communities (Amendment) Act 2006
No. 19/2006 – National Sports Campus Development Authority Act 2006
No. 20/2006 – Defence (Amendment) Act 2006
No. 21/2006 – National Economic and Social Development Office Act 2006
No. 22/2006 – Hepatitis C Compensation Tribunal (Amendment) Act 2006
No. 23/2006 – Road Traffic Act 2006
No. 24/2006 – Building Societies (Amendment) Act 2006
No. 25/2006 – Institutes of Technology Act 2006
No. 26/2006 – Criminal Justice Act 2006
No. 27/2006 – Planning and Development (Strategic Infrastructure) Act 2006
No. 28/2006 – Road Traffic and Transport Act 2006
No. 29/2006 – Sea Pollution (Miscellaneous Provisions) Act 2006
No. 30/2006 – International Criminal Court Act 2006
No. 31/2006 – Patents (Amendment) Act 2006
No. 32/2006 – British-Irish Agreement (Amendment) Act 2006
No. 33/2006 – Electoral (Amendment) Act 2006
No. 34/2006 – Industrial Development Act 2006
No. 35/2006 – Appropriation Act 2006
No. 36/2006 – Social Welfare Act 2006
No. 37/2006 – Europol (Amendment) Act 2006
No. 38/2006 – Irish Film Board (Amendment) Act 2006
No. 39/2006 – Houses of the Oireachtas Commission (Amendment) Act 2006
No. 40/2006 – Energy (Miscellaneous Provisions) Act 2006
No. 41/2006 – Investment Funds, Companies and Miscellaneous Provisions Act 2006
No. 42/2006 – Local Government (Business Improvement Districts) Act 2006

2007
No. 1/2007 – Health (Nursing Homes) (Amendment) Act 2007
No. 2/2007 – Citizens Information Act 2007
No. 3/2007 – Health Insurance (Amendment) Act 2007
No. 4/2007 – Courts and Court Officers (Amendment) Act 2007
No. 5/2007 – Electricity Regulation (Amendment) (Single Electricity Market) Act 2007
No. 6/2007 – Criminal Law (Sexual Offences) (Amendment) Act 2007
No. 7/2007 – National Oil Reserves Agency Act 2007
No. 8/2007 – Social Welfare and Pensions Act 2007
No. 9/2007 – Education (Miscellaneous Provisions) Act 2007
No. 10/2007 – Prisons Act 2007
No. 11/2007 – Finance Act 2007
No. 12/2007 – Carbon Fund Act 2007
No. 13/2007 – Asset Covered Securities (Amendment) Act 2007
No. 14/2007 – Electoral (Amendment) Act 2007
No. 15/2007 – Broadcasting (Amendment) Act 2007
No. 16/2007 – National Development Finance Agency (Amendment) Act 2007
No. 17/2007 – Foyle and Carlingford Fisheries Act 2007
No. 18/2007 – European Communities Act 2007
No. 19/2007 – Consumer Protection Act 2007
No. 20/2007 – Pharmacy Act 2007
No. 21/2007 – Building Control Act 2007
No. 22/2007 – Communications Regulation (Amendment) Act 2007
No. 23/2007 – Health Act 2007
No. 24/2007 – Defence (Amendment) Act 2007
No. 25/2007 – Medical Practitioners Act 2007
No. 26/2007 – Child Care (Amendment) Act 2007
No. 27/2007 – Protection of Employment (Exceptional Collective Redundancies and Related Matters) Act 2007
No. 28/2007 – Statute Law Revision Act 2007
No. 29/2007 – Criminal Justice Act 2007
No. 30/2007 – Water Services Act 2007
No. 31/2007 – Finance (No. 2) Act 2007
No. 32/2007 – Community, Rural and Gaeltacht Affairs (Miscellaneous Provisions) Act 2007
No. 33/2007 – Ministers and Secretaries (Ministers of State) Act 2007
No. 34/2007 – Roads Act 2007
No. 35/2007 – Personal Injuries Assessment Board (Amendment) Act 2007
No. 36/2007 – Criminal Procedure (Amendment) Act 2007
No. 37/2007 – Markets in Financial Instruments and Miscellaneous Provisions Act 2007
No. 38/2007 – Local Government (Roads Functions) Act 2007
No. 39/2007 – Copyright and Related Rights (Amendment) Act 2007
No. 40/2007 – Social Welfare Act 2007
No. 41/2007 – Appropriation Act 2007
No. 42/2007 – Health (Miscellaneous Provisions) Act 2007

2008
No. 1/2008 – Control of Exports Act 2008
No. 2/2008 – Social Welfare and Pensions Act 2008
No. 3/2008 – Finance Act 2008
No. 4/2008 – Passports Act 2008
No. 5/2008 – Motor Vehicle (Duties and Licences) Act 2008
No. 6/2008 – Voluntary Health Insurance (Amendment) Act 2008
No. 7/2008 – Criminal Justice (Mutual Assistance) Act 2008
No. 8/2008 – Criminal Law (Human Trafficking) Act 2008
No. 9/2008 – Local Government Services (Corporate Bodies) (Confirmation of Orders) Act 2008
No. 10/2008 – Prison Development (Confirmation of Resolutions) Act 2008
No. 11/2008 – Electricity Regulation (Amendment) (Eirgrid) Act 2008
No. 12/2008 – An tAcht na nDlí-Chleactóirí (An Ghaelige) 2008
No. 12/2008 – Legal Practitioners (Irish Language) Act 2008
No. 13/2008 – Chemicals Act 2008
No. 14/2008 – Civil Law (Miscellaneous Provisions) Act 2008
No. 15/2008 – Dublin Transport Authority Act 2008
No. 16/2008 – Nuclear Test Ban Act 2008
No. 17/2008 – Intoxicating Liquor Act 2008
No. 18/2008 – Credit Institutions (Financial Support) Act 2008
No. 19/2008 – Mental Health Act 2008
No. 20/2008 – Cluster Munitions And Anti-Personnel Mines Act 2008
No. 21/2008 – Health Act 2008
No. 22/2008 – Social Welfare (Miscellaneous Provisions) Act 2008
No. 23/2008 – Appropriation Act 2008
No. 24/2008 – Motor Vehicle (Duties and Licences) (No. 2) Act 2008
No. 25/2008 – Finance (No. 2) Act 2008

2009
No. 1/2009 – Anglo Irish Bank Corporation Act 2009
No. 2/2009 – Residential Tenancies (Amendment) Act 2009
No. 3/2009 – Gas (Amendment) Act 2009
No. 4/2009 – Electoral (Amendment) Act 2009
No. 5/2009 – Financial Emergency Measures in the Public Interest Act 2009
No. 6/2009 – Charities Act 2009
No. 7/2009 – Investment of the National Pensions Reserve Fund and Miscellaneous Provisions Act 2009
No. 8/2009 – Legal Services Ombudsman Act 2009
No. 9/2009 – Electoral (Amendment) (No. 2) Act 2009
No. 10/2009 – Social Welfare and Pensions Act 2009
No. 11/2009 – Industrial Development Act 2009
No. 12/2009 – Finance Act 2009
No. 13/2009 – Financial Services (Deposit Guarantee Scheme) Act 2009
No. 14/2009 – Financial Measures (Miscellaneous Provisions) Act 2009
No. 15/2009 – Nursing Homes Support Scheme Act 2009
No. 16/2009 – Aviation (Preclearance) Act 2009
No. 17/2009 – European Parliament (Irish Constituency Members) Act 2009
No. 18/2009 – Broadcasting Act 2009
No. 19/2009 – Criminal Justice (Surveillance) Act 2009
No. 20/2009 – Companies (Amendment) Act 2009
No. 21/2009 – Enforcement of Court Orders (Amendment) Act 2009
No. 22/2009 – Housing (Miscellaneous Provisions) Act 2009
No. 23/2009 – Public Health (Tobacco) (Amendment) Act 2009
No. 24/2009 – Health Insurance (Miscellaneous Provisions) Act 2009
No. 25/2009 – Health (Miscellaneous Provisions) Act 2009
No. 26/2009 – Harbours (Amendment) Act 2009
No. 27/2009 – Land and Conveyancing Law Reform Act 2009
No. 28/2009 – Criminal Justice (Miscellaneous Provisions) Act 2009
No. 29/2009 – Oireachtas (Allowances to Members) and Ministerial and Parliamentary Offices Act 2009
No. 30/2009 – Local Government (Charges) Act 2009
No. 31/2009 – Defamation Act 2009
No. 32/2009 – Criminal Justice (Amendment) Act 2009
No. 33/2009 – European Union Act 2009
No. 34/2009 – National Asset Management Agency Act 2009
No. 35/2009 – Defence (Miscellaneous Provisions) Act 2009
No. 36/2009 – Courts and Court Officers Act 2009
No. 37/2009 – Public Transport Regulation Act 2009
No. 38/2009 – Labour Services (Amendment) Act 2009
No. 39/2009 – Foreshore And Dumping At Sea (Amendment) Act 2009
No. 40/2009 – Forestry (Amendment) Act 2009
No. 41/2009 – Financial Emergency Measures in the Public Interest (No. 2) Act 2009
No. 42/2009 – Appropriation Act 2009
No. 43/2009 – Social Welfare And Pensions (No. 2) Act 2009
No. 44/2009 – Houses of the Oireachtas Commission (Amendment) Act 2009
No. 45/2009 – Companies (Miscellaneous Provisions) Act 2009
No. 46/2009 – Statute Law Revision Act 2009

Constitutional Amendments
Twenty-eighth Amendment of the Constitution (Treaty of Lisbon) Act 2009

2010–2019

2010
No. 1/2010 – Arbitration Act 2010
No. 2/2010 – Communications Regulation (Premium Rate Services and Electronic Communications Infrastructure) Act 2010
No. 3/2010 – George Mitchell Scholarship Fund (Amendment) Act 2010
No. 4/2010 – Petroleum (Exploration and Extraction) Safety Act 2010
No. 5/2010 – Finance Act 2010
No. 6/2010 – Criminal Justice (Money Laundering and Terrorist Financing) Act 2010
No. 7/2010 – Euro Area Loan Facility Act 2010
No. 8/2010 – Fines Act 2010
No. 9/2010 – Intoxicating Liquor (National Conference Centre) Act 2010
No. 10/2010 – Inland Fisheries Act 2010
No. 11/2010 – Energy (Biofuel Obligation and Miscellaneous Provisions) Act 2010
No. 12/2010 – Competition (Amendment) Act 2010
No. 13/2010 – Electricity Regulation (Amendment) (Carbon Revenue Levy) Act 2010
No. 14/2010 – Merchant Shipping Act 2010
No. 15/2010 – Health (Amendment) Act 2010
No. 16/2010 – European Financial Stability Facility Act 2010
No. 17/2010 – Compulsory Purchase Orders (Extension of Time Limits) Act 2010
No. 18/2010 – Health (Miscellaneous Provisions) Act 2010
No. 19/2010 – Wildlife (Amendment) Act 2010
No. 20/2010 – Health (Amendment) (No. 2) Act 2010
No. 21/2010 – Adoption Act 2010
No. 22/2010 – Criminal Justice (Psychoactive Substances) Act 2010
No. 23/2010 – Central Bank Reform Act 2010
No. 24/2010 – Civil Partnership and Certain Rights and Obligations of Cohabitants Act 2010
No. 25/2010 – Road Traffic Act 2010
No. 26/2010 – Údarás na Gaeltachta (Amendment) Act 2010
No. 27/2010 – Criminal Procedure Act 2010
No. 28/2010 – Social Welfare (Miscellaneous Provisions) Act 2010
No. 29/2010 – Dog Breeding Establishments Act 2010
No. 30/2010 – Planning and Development (Amendment) Act 2010
No. 31/2010 – Value-Added Tax Consolidation Act 2010
No. 32/2010 – Chemicals (Amendment) Act 2010
No. 33/2010 – Prevention of Corruption (Amendment) Act 2010
No. 34/2010 – Social Welfare Act 2010
No. 35/2010 – Appropriation Act 2010
No. 36/2010 – Credit Institutions (Stabilisation) Act 2010
No. 37/2010 – Social Welfare and Pensions Act 2010
No. 38/2010 – Financial Emergency Measures in the Public Interest Act 2010
No. 39/2010 – Public Health (Tobacco) (Amendment) Act 2010
No. 40/2010 – Criminal Law (Insanity) Act 2010

2011
No. 1/2011 – Bretton Woods Agreements (Amendment) Act 2011
No. 2/2011 – Multi-Unit Developments Act 2011
No. 3/2011 – Communications (Retention of Data) Act 2011
No. 4/2011 – Student Support Act 2011
No. 5/2011 – Criminal Justice (Public Order) Act 2011
No. 6/2011 – Finance Act 2011
No. 7/2011 – Road Traffic Act 2011
No. 8/2011 – Finance (No. 2) Act 2011
No. 9/2011 – Social Welfare and Pensions Act 2011
No. 10/2011 – Ministers and Secretaries (Amendment) Act 2011
No. 11/2011 – Foreshore (Amendment) Act 2011
No. 12/2011 – Medical Practitioners (Amendment) Act 2011
No. 13/2011 – Biological Weapons Act 2011
No. 14/2011 – Electoral (Amendment) Act 2011
No. 15/2011 – Public Health (Tobacco) (Amendment) Act 2011
No. 16/2011 – Residential Institutions Redress (Amendment) Act 2011
No. 17/2011 – Defence (Amendment) Act 2011
No. 18/2011 – Finance (No. 3) Act 2011
No. 19/2011 – Child Care (Amendment) Act 2011
No. 20/2011 – Environment (Miscellaneous Provisions) Act 2011
No. 21/2011 – Communications Regulation (Postal Services) Act 2011
No. 22/2011 – Criminal Justice Act 2011
No. 23/2011 – Civil Law (Miscellaneous Provisions) Act 2011
No. 24/2011 – Criminal Justice (Community Service) (Amendment) Act 2011
No. 25/2011 – European Financial Stability Facility and Euro Area Loan Facility (Amendment) Act 2011
No. 26/2011 – Insurance (Amendment) Act 2011
No. 27/2011 – Central Bank and Credit Institutions (Resolution) Act 2011
No. 28/2011 – Road Traffic (No. 2) Act 2011
No. 29/2011 – Welfare of Greyhounds Act 2011
No. 30/2011 – Access to Central Treasury Funds (Commission for Energy Regulation) Act 2011
No. 31/2011 – Road Transport Act 2011
No. 32/2011 – Irish Film Board (Amendment) Act 2011
No. 33/2011 – National Tourism Development Authority (Amendment) Act 2011
No. 34/2011 – Health Insurance (Miscellaneous Provisions) Act 2011
No. 35/2011 – Criminal Law (Defence and the Dwelling) Act 2011
No. 36/2011 – Local Government (Household Charge) Act 2011
No. 37/2011 – Social Welfare Act 2011
No. 38/2011 – Appropriation Act 2011
No. 39/2011 – Financial Emergency Measures in the Public Interest (Amendment) Act 2011
No. 40/2011 – Property Services (Regulation) Act 2011
No. 41/2011 – Nurses and Midwives Act 2011

Constitutional Amendments
Twenty-ninth Amendment of the Constitution Act 2011

2012
No. 1/2012 – Patents (Amendment) Act 2012
No. 2/2012 – Water Services (Amendment) Act 2012
No. 3/2012 – Energy (Miscellaneous Provisions) Act 2012
No. 4/2012 – Health (Provision of General Practitioner Services) Act 2012
No. 5/2012 – Bretton Woods Agreements (Amendment) Act 2012
No. 6/2012 – Euro Area Loan Facility (Amendment) Act 2012
No. 7/2012 – Jurisdiction of Courts and Enforcement of Judgments (Amendment) Act 2012
No. 8/2012 – Clotting Factor Concentrates and Other Biological Products Act 2012
No. 9/2012 – Finance Act 2012
No. 10/2012 – Motor Vehicle (Duties And Licences) Act 2012
No. 11/2012 – Criminal Justice (Female Genital Mutilation) Act 2012
No. 12/2012 – Social Welfare and Pensions Act 2012
No. 13/2012 – Protection of Employees (Temporary Agency Work) Act 2012
No. 14/2012 – Education (Amendment) Act 2012
No. 15/2012 – Electricity Regulation (Carbon Revenue Levy) (Amendment) Act 2012
No. 16/2012 – Road Safety Authority (Commercial Vehicle Roadworthiness) Act 2012
No. 17/2012 – Local Government (Miscellaneous Provisions) Act 2012
No. 18/2012 – Competition (Amendment) Act 2012
No. 19/2012 – Statute Law Revision Act 2012
No. 20/2012 – European Stability Mechanism Act 2012
No. 21/2012 – European Communities (Amendment) Act 2012
No. 22/2012 – Companies (Amendment) Act 2012
No. 23/2012 – Dormant Accounts (Amendment) Act 2012
No. 24/2012 – Criminal Justice (Withholding of Information on Offences against Children and Vulnerable Persons) Act 2012
No. 25/2012 – Veterinary Practice (Amendment) Act 2012
No. 26/2012 – Credit Guarantee Act 2012
No. 27/2012 – Electoral (Amendment) Act 2012
No. 28/2012 – Qualifications and Quality Assurance (Education and Training) Act 2012
No. 29/2012 – Wildlife (Amendment) Act 2012
No. 30/2012 – European Arrest Warrant (Application to Third Countries and Amendment) and Extradition (Amendment) Act 2012
No. 31/2012 – Microenterprise Loan Fund Act 2012
No. 32/2012 – Industrial Relations (Amendment) Act 2012
No. 33/2012 – Criminal Justice (Search Warrants) Act 2012
No. 34/2012 – Gaeltacht Act 2012
No. 35/2012 – Residential Institutions Statutory Fund Act 2012
No. 36/2012 – Electoral (Amendment) (Political Funding) Act 2012
No. 37/2012 – Public Service Pensions (Single Scheme and Other Provisions) Act 2012
No. 38/2012 – Ombudsman (Amendment) Act 2012
No. 39/2012 – Fiscal Responsibility Act 2012
No. 40/2012 – Credit Union and Co-Operation With Overseas Regulators Act 2012
No. 41/2012 – Equal Status (Amendment) Act 2012
No. 42/2012 – Appropriation Act 2012
No. 43/2012 – Social Welfare Act 2012
No. 44/2012 – Personal Insolvency Act 2012
No. 45/2012 – Health Insurance (Amendment) Act 2012
No. 46/2012 – Health and Social Care Professionals (Amendment) Act 2012
No. 47/2012 – National Vetting Bureau (Children and Vulnerable Persons) Act 2012
No. 48/2012 – Civil Registration (Amendment) Act 2012
No. 49/2012 – Transport (Córas Iompair Éireann and Subsidiary Companies Borrowings) Act 2012
No. 50/2012 – Houses of the Oireachtas Commission (Amendment) (No. 2) Act 2012
No. 51/2012 – Civil Defence Act 2012
No. 52/2012 – Finance (Local Property Tax) Act 2012
No. 53/2012 – Europol Act 2012

Constitutional Amendments
Thirtieth Amendment of the Constitution Act 2012
Thirty-first Amendment of the Constitution Act 2012

2013
No. 1/2013 – Euro Area Loan Facility (Amendment) Act 2013
No. 2/2013 – Irish Bank Resolution Corporation Act 2013
No. 3/2013 – Houses of the Oireachtas Commission (Amendment) Act 2013
No. 4/2013 – Finance (Local Property Tax) (Amendment) Act 2013
No. 5/2013 – Child Care (Amendment) Act 2013
No. 6/2013 – Water Services Act 2013
No. 7/2013 – Electoral (Amendment) (Dáil Constituencies) Act 2013
No. 8/2013 – Finance Act 2013
No. 9/2013 – Motor Vehicle (Duties and Licences) Act 2013
No. 10/2013 – Health (Alteration of Criteria for Eligibility) Act 2013
No. 11/2013 – Education and Training Boards Act 2013
No. 12/2013 – Defence Forces (Second World War Amnesty and Immunity) Act 2013
No. 13/2013 – National Lottery Act 2013
No. 14/2013 – Health (Pricing and Supply of Medical Goods) Act 2013
No. 15/2013 – Animal Health and Welfare Act 2013
No. 16/2013 – Non-Use of Motor Vehicles Act 2013
No. 17/2013 – Public Health (Tobacco) (Amendment) Act 2013
No. 18/2013 – Financial Emergency Measures in the Public Interest Act 2013
No. 19/2013 – Criminal Justice Act 2013
No. 20/2013 – Social Welfare and Pensions (Miscellaneous Provisions) Act 2013
No. 21/2013 – European Union (Accession of the Republic of Croatia) (Access to the Labour Market) Act 2013
No. 22/2013 – Housing (Amendment) Act 2013
No. 23/2013 – Health Service Executive (Governance) Act 2013
No. 24/2013 – Criminal Law (Human Trafficking) (Amendment) Act 2013
No. 25/2013 – Further Education and Training Act 2013
No. 26/2013 – Central Bank (Supervision and Enforcement) Act 2013
No. 27/2013 – Electoral, Local Government and Planning and Development Act 2013
No. 28/2013 – Prison Development (Confirmation of Resolutions) Act 2013
No. 29/2013 – Ministers and Secretaries (Amendment) Act 2013
No. 30/2013 – Land and Conveyancing Law Reform Act 2013
No. 31/2013 – Health (Amendment) Act 2013
No. 32/2013 – Courts and Civil Law (Miscellaneous Provisions) Act 2013
No. 33/2013 – Houses of the Oireachtas (Inquiries, Privileges and Procedures) Act 2013
No. 34/2013 – Construction Contracts Act 2013
No. 35/2013 – Protection of Life During Pregnancy Act 2013
No. 36/2013 – Industrial Development (Science Foundation Ireland) (Amendment) Act 2013
No. 37/2013 – Taxi Regulation Act 2013
No. 38/2013 – Social Welfare and Pensions Act 2013
No. 39/2013 – Gas Regulation Act 2013
No. 40/2013 – Child and Family Agency Act 2013
No. 41/2013 – Finance (No. 2) Act 2013
No. 42/2013 – Health (Alteration of Criteria for Eligibility) Act 2013
No. 43/2013 – Appropriation Act 2013
No. 44/2013 – Adoption (Amendment) Act 2013
No. 45/2013 – Credit Reporting Act 2013
No. 46/2013 – Companies (Miscellaneous Provisions) Act 2013
No. 47/2013 – Public Service Management (Recruitment and Appointments) (Amendment) Act 2013
No. 48/2013 – Health Insurance (Amendment) Act 2013
No. 49/2013 – Social Welfare and Pensions (No. 2) Act 2013
No. 50/2013 – Water Services (No. 2) Act 2013
No. 51/2013 – Pyrite Resolution Act 2013

Constitutional Amendments
Thirty-third Amendment of the Constitution Act 2013

2014
No. 1/2014 – Local Government Reform Act 2014
No. 2/2014 – European Parliament Elections (Amendment) Act 2014
No. 3/2014 – Road Traffic Act 2014
No. 4/2014 – County Enterprise Boards (Dissolution) Act 2014
No. 5/2014 – ESB (Electronic Communications Networks) Act 2014
No. 6/2014 – Oireachtas (Ministerial and Parliamentary Offices) (Amendment) Act 2014
No. 7/2014 – Fines (Payment and Recovery) Act 2014
No. 8/2014 – Electoral (Amendment) Act 2014
No. 9/2014 – Central Bank Act 2014
No. 10/2014 – Johnstown Castle Agricultural College (Amendment) Act 2014
No. 11/2014 – Criminal Justice (Forensic Evidence and DNA Database System) Act 2014
No. 12/2014 – Public Health (Sunbeds) Act 2014
No. 13/2014 – Industrial Development (Forfás Dissolution) Act 2014
No. 14/2014 – Protected Disclosures Act 2014
No. 15/2014 – Health Identifiers Act 2014
No. 16/2014 – Social Welfare and Pensions Act 2014
No. 17/2014 – Health Service Executive (Financial Matters) Act 2014
No. 18/2014 – Court of Appeal Act 2014
No. 19/2014 – Friendly Societies and Industrial and Provident Societies (Miscellaneous Provisions) Act 2014
No. 20/2014 – Radiological Protection (Miscellaneous Provisions) Act 2014
No. 21/2014 – Housing (Miscellaneous Provisions) Act 2014
No. 22/2014 – Strategic Banking Corporation of Ireland Act 2014
No. 23/2014 – National Treasury Management Agency (Amendment) Act 2014
No. 24/2014 – Electoral (Amendment) (No. 2) Act 2014
No. 25/2014 – Irish Human Rights and Equality Commission Act 2014
No. 26/2014 – Employment Permits (Amendment) Act 2014
No. 27/2014 – State Airports (Shannon Group) Act 2014
No. 28/2014 – Health (General Practitioner Service) Act 2014
No. 29/2014 – Competition and Consumer Protection Act 2014
No. 30/2014 – Freedom of Information Act 2014
No. 31/2014 – Forestry Act 2014
No. 32/2014 – European Stability Mechanism (Amendment) Act 2014
No. 33/2014 – Health (Miscellaneous Provisions) Act 2014
No. 34/2014 – Civil Registration (Amendment) Act 2014
No. 35/2014 – Appropriation Act 2014
No. 36/2014 – Intellectual Property (Miscellaneous Provisions) Act 2014
No. 37/2014 – Finance Act 2014
No. 38/2014 – Companies Act 2014
No. 39/2014 – Road Traffic (No. 2) Act 2014
No. 40/2014 – Protection of Children's Health (Tobacco Smoke in Mechanically Propelled Vehicles) Act 2014
No. 41/2014 – Social Welfare and Pensions (No. 2) Act 2014
No. 42/2014 – Health Insurance (Amendment) Act 2014
No. 43/2014 – Merchant Shipping (Registration of Ships) Act 2014
No. 44/2014 – Water Services Act 2014

2015
No. 1/2015 – Central Bank (Amendment) Act 2015
No. 2/2015 – Irish Collective Asset-Management Vehicles Act 2015
No. 3/2015 – Garda Síochána (Amendment) Act 2015
No. 4/2015 – Public Health (Standardised Packaging of Tobacco) Act 2015
No. 5/2015 – Regulation of Lobbying Act 2015
No. 6/2015 – Misuse of Drugs (Amendment) Act 2015
No. 7/2015 – Betting (Amendment) Act 2015
No. 8/2015 – Redress for Women Resident in Certain Institutions Act 2015
No. 9/2015 – Children and Family Relationships Act 2015
No. 10/2015 – Valuation (Amendment) Act 2015
No. 11/2015 – Education (Miscellaneous Provisions) Act 2015
No. 12/2015 – Social Welfare (Miscellaneous Provisions) Act 2015
No. 13/2015 – Vehicle Clamping Act 2015
No. 14/2015 – Roads Act 2015
No. 15/2015 – Sport Ireland Act 2015
No. 16/2015 – Workplace Relations Act 2015
No. 17/2015 – Criminal Justice (Terrorist Offences) (Amendment) Act 2015
No. 18/2015 – Customs Act 2015
No. 19/2015 – Health (General Practitioner Service) Act 2015
No. 20/2015 – Communications Regulation (Postal Services) (Amendment) Act 2015
No. 21/2015 – Consumer Protection (Regulation of Credit Servicing Firms) Act 2015
No. 22/2015 – National Minimum Wage (Low Pay Commission) Act 2015
No. 23/2015 – Statute Law Revision Act 2015
No. 24/2015 – Defence (Amendment) Act 2015
No. 25/2015 – Gender Recognition Act 2015
No. 26/2015 – Petroleum (Exploration and Extraction) Safety Act 2015
No. 27/2015 – Industrial Relations (Amendment) Act 2015
No. 28/2015 – Civil Debt (Procedures) Act 2015
No. 29/2015 – Environment (Miscellaneous Provisions) Act 2015
No. 30/2015 – Children (Amendment) Act 2015
No. 31/2015 – Teaching Council (Amendment) Act 2015
No. 32/2015 – Personal Insolvency (Amendment) Act 2015
No. 33/2015 – Urban Regeneration and Housing Act 2015
No. 34/2015 – Houses of the Oireachtas (Appointments to Certain Offices) Act 2015
No. 35/2015 – Marriage Act 2015
No. 36/2015 – Children First Act 2015
No. 37/2015 – Finance (Miscellaneous Provisions) Act 2015
No. 38/2015 – Choice of Court (Hague Convention) Act 2015
No. 39/2015 – Financial Emergency Measures in the Public Interest Act 2015
No. 40/2015 – Criminal Justice (Mutual Assistance) (Amendment) Act 2015
No. 41/2015 – Motor Vehicle (Duties and Licences) Act 2015
No. 42/2015 – Residential Tenancies (Amendment) Act 2015
No. 43/2015 – Equality (Miscellaneous Provisions) Act 2015
No. 44/2015 – National Cultural Institutions (National Concert Hall) Act 2015
No. 45/2015 – Child Care (Amendment) Act 2015
No. 46/2015 – Climate Action and Low Carbon Development Act 2015
No. 47/2015 – Social Welfare and Pensions Act 2015
No. 48/2015 – Appropriation Act 2015
No. 49/2015 – Garda Síochána (Policing Authority and Miscellaneous Provisions) Act 2015
No. 50/2015 – Finance (Local Property Tax) (Amendment) Act 2015
No. 51/2015 – Courts Act 2015
No. 52/2015 – Finance Act 2015
No. 53/2015 – Houses of the Oireachtas Commission (Amendment) Act 2015
No. 54/2015 – Health Insurance (Amendment) Act 2015
No. 55/2015 – Dublin Docklands Development Authority (Dissolution) Act 2015
No. 56/2015 – Criminal Justice (Burglary of Dwellings) Act 2015
No. 57/2015 – Prisons Act 2015
No. 58/2015 – Mental Health (Amendment) Act 2015
No. 59/2015 – Finance (Tax Appeals) Act 2015
No. 60/2015 – Bankruptcy (Amendment) Act 2015
No. 61/2015 – Harbours Act 2015
No. 62/2015 – Electoral (Amendment) Act 2015
No. 63/2015 – Planning and Development (Amendment) Act 2015
No. 64/2015 – Assisted Decision-Making (Capacity) Act 2015
No. 65/2015 – Legal Services Regulation Act 2015
No. 66/2015 – International Protection Act 2015

Constitutional Amendments
Thirty-fourth Amendment of the Constitution Act 2015

2016
No. 1/2016 – Credit Guarantee (Amendment) Act 2016
No. 2/2016 – Horse Racing Ireland Act 2016
No. 3/2016 – Public Transport Act 2016
No. 4/2016 – Criminal Justice (Spent Convictions and Certain Disclosures) Act 2016
No. 5/2016 – Electoral (Amendment) Act 2016
No. 6/2016 – Health (Amendment) Act 2016
No. 7/2016 – Water Services (Amendment) Act 2016
No. 8/2016 – Proceeds of Crime (Amendment) Act 2016
No. 9/2016 – Misuse of Drugs (Amendment) Act 2016
No. 10/2016 – Commission of investigation (Irish Bank Resolution Corporation) Act 2016
No. 11/2016 – Paternity Leave and Benefit Act 2016
No. 12/2016 – Energy Act 2016
No. 13/2016 – Finance (Certain European Union and Intergovernmental Obligations) Act 2016
No. 14/2016 – National Tourism Development Authority (Amendment) Act 2016
No. 15/2016 – Social Welfare Act 2016
No. 16/2016 – Appropriation Act 2016
No. 17/2016 – Planning and Development (Housing) and Residential Tenancies Act 2016
No. 18/2016 – Finance Act 2016
No. 19/2016 – Health Insurance (Amendment) Act 2016
No. 20/2016 – Statute Law Revision Act 2016
No. 21/2016 – Road Traffic Act 2016
No. 22/2016 – Courts Act 2016

2017
No. 1/2017 – Health (Miscellaneous Provisions) Act 2017
No. 2/2017 – Criminal Law (Sexual Offences) Act 2017
No. 3/2017 – Communications Regulation (Postal Services) (Amendment) Act 2017
No. 4/2017 – Criminal Justice (Suspended Sentences of Imprisonment) Act 2017
No. 5/2017 – Health (Amendment) Act 2017
No. 6/2017 – Knowledge Development Box (Certification of Inventions) Act 2017
No. 7/2017 – Misuse of Drugs (Supervised Injecting Facilities) Act 2017
No. 8/2017 – Courts Act 2017
No. 9/2017 – Companies (Accounting) Act 2017
No. 10/2017 – Medical Practitioners (Amendment) Act 2017
No. 11/2017 – Criminal Justice (Offences Relating to Information Systems) Act 2017
No. 12/2017 – Competition (Amendment) Act 2017
No. 13/2017 – Companies (Amendment) Act 2017
No. 14/2017 – Criminal Justice Act 2017
No. 15/2017 – Petroleum and Other Minerals Development (Prohibition of Onshore Hydraulic Fracturing) Act 2017
No. 16/2017 – Inland Fisheries (Amendment) Act 2017
No. 17/2017 – Rugby World Cup 2023 Act 2017
No. 18/2017 – Ministers and Secretaries (Amendment) Act 2017
No. 19/2017 – Adoption (Amendment) Act 2017
No. 20/2017 – Planning and Development (Amendment) Act 2017
No. 21/2017 – Central Bank and Financial Services Authority of Ireland (Amendment) Act 2017
No. 22/2017 – Financial Services and Pensions Ombudsman Act 2017
No. 23/2017 – Minerals Development Act 2017
No. 24/2017 – Asian Infrastructure Investment Bank Act 2017
No. 25/2017 – Independent Reporting Commission Act 2017
No. 26/2017 – National Shared Services Office Act 2017
No. 27/2017 – Mediation Act 2017
No. 28/2017 – Criminal Justice (Victims of Crime) Act 2017
No. 29/2017 – Water Services Act 2017
No. 30/2017 – Civil Liability (Amendment) Act 2017
No. 31/2017 – Legal Metrology (Measuring Instruments) Act 2017
No. 32/2017 – Health and Social Care Professionals (Amendment) Act 2017
No. 33/2017 – Diplomatic Relations (Miscellaneous Provisions) Act 2017
No. 34/2017 – Public Service Pay and Pensions Act 2017
No. 35/2017 – Appropriation Act 2017
No. 36/2017 – Protection of Cultural Property in the Event of Armed Conflict (Hague Convention) Act 2017
No. 37/2017 – Health Insurance (Amendment) Act 2017
No. 38/2017 – Social Welfare Act 2017
No. 39/2017 – Electoral Amendment (Dáil Constituencies) Act 2017
No. 40/2017 – Irish Sign Language Act 2017
No. 41/2017 – Finance Act 2017

2018
No. 1/2018 – Intoxicating Liquor (Amendment) Act 2018
No. 2/2018 – Public Service Superannuation (Amendment) Act 2018
No. 3/2018 – Technological Universities Act 2018
No. 4/2018 – Telecommunications Services (Ducting and Cables) Act 2018
No. 5/2018 – Vehicle Registration Data (Automated Searching and Exchange) Act 2018
No. 6/2018 – Domestic Violence Act 2018
No. 7/2018 – Data Protection Act 2018
No. 8/2018 – Radiological Protection (Amendment) Act 2018
No. 9/2018 – Criminal Justice (Corruption Offences) Act 2018
No. 10/2018 – Mental Health (Amendment) Act 2018
No. 11/2018 – Childcare Support Act 2018
No. 12/2018 – National Archives (Amendment) Act 2018
No. 13/2018 – Health (General Practitioner Service) Act 2018
No. 14/2018 – Education (Admission to Schools) Act 2018
No. 15/2018 – Heritage Act 2018
No. 16/2018 – Planning and Development (Amendment) Act 2018
No. 17/2018 – Intoxicating Liquor (Breweries and Distilleries) Act 2018
No. 18/2018 – Road Traffic (Amendment) Act 2018
No. 19/2018 – Industrial Development (Amendment) Act 2018
No. 20/2018 – Children and Family Relationships (Amendment) Act 2018
No. 21/2018 – Insurance (Amendment) Act 2018
No. 22/2018 – Companies (Statutory Audits) Act 2018
No. 23/2018 – Mental Health (Renewal Orders) Act 2018
No. 24/2018 – Public Health (Alcohol) Act 2018
No. 25/2018 – Markets in Financial Instruments Act 2018
No. 26/2018 – Criminal Justice (Money Laundering and Terrorist Financing) (Amendment) Act 2018
No. 27/2018 – Children's Health Act 2018
No. 28/2018 – Home Building Finance Ireland Act 2018
No. 29/2018 – Fossil Fuel Divestment Act 2018
No. 30/2018 – Finance Act 2018
No. 31/2018 – Health (Regulation of Termination of Pregnancy) Act 2018
No. 32/2018 – European Investment Fund Agreement Act 2018
No. 33/2018 – Appropriation Act 2018
No. 34/2018 – Irish Film Board (Amendment) Act 2018
No. 35/2018 – Health Insurance (Amendment) Act 2018
No. 36/2018 – Consumer Protection (Regulation of Credit Servicing Firms) Act 2018
No. 37/2018 – Social Welfare, Pensions and Civil Registration Act 2018
No. 38/2018 – Employment (Miscellaneous Provisions) Act 2018
No. 39/2018 – Public Service Superannuation (Age of Retirement) Act 2018
No. 40/2018 – Finance (African Development (Bank and Fund) and Miscellaneous Provisions) Act 2018
No. 41/2018 – Houses of the Oireachtas Commission (Amendment) Act 2018
No. 42/2018 – Central Bank (National Claims Information Database) Act 2018

Constitutional Amendments
Thirty-sixth Amendment of the Constitution Act 2018
Thirty-seventh Amendment of the Constitution Act 2018

2019
No. 1/2019 – Local Government Act 2019
No. 2/2019 – Hallmarking (Amendment) Act 2019
No. 3/2019 – Personal Injuries Assessment Board (Amendment) Act 2019
No. 4/2019 – Criminal Law (Sexual Offences) (Amendment) Act 2019
No. 5/2019 – Data Sharing and Governance Act 2019
No. 6/2019 – Criminal Law (Extraterritorial Jurisdiction) Act 2019
No. 7/2019 – European Parliament Elections (Amendment) Act 2019
No. 8/2019 – Withdrawal of the United Kingdom from the European Union (Consequential Provisions) Act 2019
No. 9/2019 – Sea-Fisheries (Amendment) Act 2019
No. 10/2019 – Companies (Amendment) Act 2019
No. 11/2019 – Parental Leave (Amendment) Act 2019
No. 12/2019 – Aircraft Noise (Dublin Airport) Regulation Act 2019
No. 13/2019 – Civil Registration Act 2019
No. 14/2019 – Residential Tenancies (Amendment) Act 2019
No. 15/2019 – Greyhound Racing Act 2019
No. 16/2019 – Health and Social Care Professionals (Amendment) Act 2019
No. 17/2019 – Health Service Executive (Governance) Act 2019
No. 18/2019 – National Surplus (Reserve Fund for Exceptional Contingencies) Act 2019
No. 19/2019 – Copyright and Other Intellectual Property Law Provisions Act 2019
No. 20/2019 – Criminal Justice (Mutual Recognition of Probation Judgements and Decisions) Act 2019
No. 21/2019 – Industrial Relations (Amendment) Act 2019
No. 22/2019 – Land and Conveyancing Law Reform (Amendment) Act 2019
No. 23/2019 – Civil Law (Presumption of Death) Act 2019
No. 24/2019 – Local Government Rates and other Matters Act 2019
No. 25/2019 – Citizens' Assemblies Act 2019
No. 26/2019 – Redress for Women Resident in Certain Institutions (Amendment) Act 2019
No. 27/2019 – Criminal Justice (International Co-Operation) Act 2019
No. 28/2019 – Parole Act 2019
No. 29/2019 – Coroners (Amendment) Act 2019
No. 30/2019 – Courts Act 2019
No. 31/2019 – CervicalCheck Tribunal Act 2019
No. 32/2019 – Qualifications and Quality Assurance (Education and Training) (Amendment) Act 2019
No. 33/2019 – Judicial Council Act 2019
No. 34/2019 – Social Welfare Act 2019
No. 35/2019 – Parent's Leave and Benefit Act 2019
No. 36/2019 – Health and Childcare Support (Miscellaneous Provisions) Act 2019
No. 37/2019 – Family Law Act 2019
No. 38/2019 – Consumer Protection (Gift Vouchers) Act 2019.
No. 39/2019 – Finance (Tax Appeals and Prospectus Regulation) Act 2019
No. 40/2019 – Prohibition of Nuclear Weapons Act 2019
No. 41/2019 – Appropriation Act 2019
No. 42/2019 – Landlord and Tenant (Ground Rents) (Amendment) Act 2019
No. 43/2019 – Blasphemy (Abolition of Offences and Related Matters) Act 2019
No. 44/2019 – Gaming and Lotteries (Amendment) Act 2019
No. 45/2019 – Finance Act 2019
No. 46/2019 – Industrial Development (Amendment) Act 2019
No. 47/2019 – Housing (Regulation of Approved Housing Bodies) Act 2019
No. 48/2019 – Social Welfare (No. 2) Act 2019.
No. 49/2019 – Health Insurance (Amendment) Act 2019.
No. 50/2019 – Migration of Participating Securities Act 2019.
No. 51/2019 – Criminal Records (Exchange of Information) Act 2019
No. 52/2019 – Microbeads (Prohibition) Act 2019
No. 53/2019 – Consumer Insurance Contracts Act 2019

Constitutional Amendments
Thirty-eighth Amendment of the Constitution (Dissolution of Marriage) Act 2019

2020–

2020
No. 1/2020 – Health (Preservation and Protection and other Emergency Measures in the Public Interest) Act 2020
No. 2/2020 – Emergency Measures in the Public Interest (COVID-19) Act 2020
No. 3/2020 – Microenterprise Loan Fund (Amendment) Act 2020
No. 4/2020 – Financial Provisions (COVID-19) Act 2020
No. 5/2020 – Credit Guarantee (Amendment) Act 2020
No. 6/2020 – National Oil Reserves Agency (Amendment) and Provision of Central Treasury Services Act 2020
No. 7/2020 – Residential Tenancies and Valuation Act 2020
No. 8/2020 – Financial Provisions (COVID-19) (No. 2) Act 2020
No. 9/2020 – Companies (Miscellaneous Provisions (COVID-19) Act 2020
No. 10/2020 – Ministers and Secretaries and Ministerial, Parliamentary, Judicial and Court Offices (Amendment) Act 2020
No. 11/2020 – Health (General Practitioner Service and Alteration of Criteria for Eligibility) Act 2020
No. 12/2020 – Social Welfare (COVID-19) (Amendment) Act 2020
No. 13/2020 – Civil Law and Criminal Law (Miscellaneous Provisions) Act 2020
No. 14/2020 – Criminal Justice (Enforcement Powers) (COVID-19) Act 2020
No. 15/2020 – Forestry (Miscellaneous Provisions) Act 2020
No. 16/2020 – Regulated Professions (Health and Social Care) (Amendment) Act 2020
No. 17/2020 – Residential Tenancies Act 2020
No. 18/2020 – Railway Safety (Reporting and Investigation of Serious Accidents, Accidents and Incidents Involving Certain Railways) Act 2020
No. 19/2020 – Health (Amendment) Act 2020
No. 20/2020 – Commission of Investigation (Mother and Baby Homes and Certain Related Matters) Records, and Another Matter, Act 2020
No. 21/2020 – Criminal Justice (Mutual Recognition of Decisions on Supervision Measures) Act 2020
No. 22/2020 – Credit Union Restructuring Board (Dissolution) Act 2020
No. 23/2020 – Withdrawal of the United Kingdom from the European Union (Consequential Provisions) Act 2020
No. 24/2020 – Health Insurance (Amendment) Act 2020
No. 25/2020 – Finance (Miscellaneous Provisions) Act 2020
No. 26/2020 – Finance Act 2020
No. 27/2020 – Planning and Development, and Residential Tenancies, Act 2020
No. 28/2020 – Central Mental Hospital (Relocation) Act 2020
No. 29/2020 – Appropriation Act 2020
No. 30/2020 – Social Welfare Act 2020
No. 31/2020 – Investment Limited Partnerships (Amendment) Act 2020
No. 32/2020 – Harassment, Harmful Communications and Related Offences Act 2020

2021
No. 1/2021 – Health (Amendment) Act 2021
No. 2/2021 – Criminal Justice (Theft and Fraud Offences) (Amendment) Act 2021
No. 3/2021 – Criminal Justice (Money Laundering and Terrorist Financing) (Amendment) Act 2021
No. 4/2021 – Family Leave and Miscellaneous Provisions Act 2021
No. 5/2021 – Residential Tenancies Act 2021
No. 6/2021 – Children (Amendment) Act 2021
No. 7/2021 – Criminal Procedure Act 2021
No. 8/2021 – Education (Leaving Certificate 2021) (Accredited Grades) Act 2021
No. 9/2021 – Loan Guarantee Schemes Agreements (Strategic Banking Corporation of Ireland) Act 2021
No. 10/2021 – Personal Insolvency (Amendment) Act 2021
No. 11/2021 – Planning and Development, Heritage and Broadcasting (Amendment) Act 2021
No. 12/2021 – Health and Criminal Justice (COVID-19) (Amendment) Act 2021
No. 13/2021 – Criminal Justice (Perjury and Related Offences) Act 2021
No. 14/2021 – Civil Law (Miscellaneous Provisions) Act 2021
No. 15/2021 – Public Service Pay Act 2021
No. 16/2021 – Counterfeiting Act 2021
No. 17/2021 – Residential Tenancies (No. 2) Act 2021
No. 18/2021 – Planning and Development (Amendment) Act 2021
No. 19/2021 – Private Security Services (Amendment) Act 2021
No. 20/2021 – Gender Pay Gap Information Act 2021
No. 21/2021 – Sale of Tickets (Cultural, Entertainment, Recreational and Sporting Events) Act 2021
No. 22/2021 – CervicalCheck Tribunal (Amendment) Act 2021
No. 23/2021 – Finance (COVID-19 and Miscellaneous Provisions) Act 2021
No. 24/2021 – Health (Amendment) (No. 2) Act 2021
No. 25/2021 – Affordable Housing Act 2021
No. 26/2021 – Land Development Agency Act 2021
No. 27/2021 – Nursing Homes Support Scheme (Amendment) Act 2021
No. 28/2021 – Maritime Jurisdiction Act 2021
No. 29/2021 – Workplace Relations (Miscellaneous Provisions) Act 2021
No. 30/2021 – Companies (Rescue Process For Small and Micro Companies) Act 2021
No. 31/2021 – Finance (Local Property Tax) (Amendment) Act 2021
No. 32/2021 – Climate Action and Low Carbon Development (Amendment) Act 2021
No. 33/2021 – Defence (Amendment) Act 2021
No. 34/2021 – Child and Family Agency (Amendment) Act 2021
No. 35/2021 – Land and Conveyancing Law Reform Act 2021

2022
No. 1/2022 – Electricity Costs (Domestic Electricity Accounts) Emergency Measures Act 2022
No. 2/2022 – Sea Fisheries (Miscellaneous Provisions) Act 2022
No. 3/2022 – Redundancy Payments (Amendment) Act 2022
No. 4/2022 – Animal Health and Welfare and Forestry (Miscellaneous Provisions) Act 2022
No. 5/2022 – Consumer Protection (Regulation of Retail Credit and Credit Servicing Firms) Act 2022
No. 6/2022 – Health (Miscellaneous Provisions) Act 2022
No. 7/2022 – Garda Síochána (Functions and Operational Areas) Act 2022
No. 8/2022 – Merchant Shipping (Investigation of Marine Casualties) (Amendment) Act 2022
No. 9/2022 – Finance (COVID-19 and Miscellaneous Provisions) Act 2022
No. 10/2022 – Garda Síochána (Amendment) Act 2022
No. 11/2022 – Insurance (Miscellaneous Provisions) Act 2022
No. 12/2022 – Competition (Amendment) Act 2022
No. 13/2022 – Consumer Credit (Amendment) Act 2022
No. 14/2022 – Birth Information and Tracing Act 2022
No. 15/2022 – Regulation of Providers of Building Works and Miscellaneous Provisions Act 2022
No. 16/2022 – Defence Forces (Evidence) Act 2022
No. 17/2022 – Eirgrid, Electricity and Turf (Amendment) Act 2022
No. 18/2022 – Institutional Burials Act 2022
No. 19/2022 – Civil Law (Miscellaneous Provisions) Act 2022
No. 20/2022 – Health (Miscellaneous Provisions) (No. 2) Act 2022
No. 21/2022 – Child Care (Amendment) Act 2022
No. 22/2022 – Education (Provision in Respect of Children with Special Needs) Act 2022
No. 23/2022 – Payment of Wages (Amendment) (Tips and Gratuities) Act 2022
No. 24/2022 – Sick Leave Act 2022
No. 25/2022 – Communications (Retention of Data) (Amendment) Act 2022
No. 26/2022 – Circular Economy and Miscellaneous Provisions Act 2022
No. 27/2022 – Protected Disclosures (Amendment) Act 2022
No. 28/2022 – Remediation of Dwellings Damaged by the use of Defective Concrete Blocks Act 2022
No. 29/2022 – Planning and Development, Maritime and Valuation (Amendment) Act 2022
No. 30/2022 – Electoral Reform Act 2022
No. 31/2022 – Higher Education Authority Act 2022
No. 32/2022 – Electricity Costs (Domestic Electricity Accounts) Emergency Measures and Miscellaneous Provisions Act 2022
No. 33/2022 – Garda Síochána (Compensation) Act 2022
No. 34/2022 – Residential Tenancies (Deferment of Termination Dates of Certain Tenancies) Act 2022
No. 35/2022 – Development (Emergency Electricity Generation) Act 2022
No. 36/2022 – Bretton Woods Agreements (Amendment) Act 2022
No. 37/2022 – Consumer Rights Act 2022

See also
List of Acts of the Parliament of Ireland to 1700 for pre-1700 legislation
List of Acts of the Parliament of Ireland, 1701–1800 for pre-1800 legislation
List of Acts of Parliament in the United Kingdom
Irish Statute Book

References

External links
 Acts of the Oireachtas from the Irish Statute Book
 Acts of the Oireachtas 1922–2009 from the Oireachtas website, with text in English and Irish
 Bills & Acts index from the Oireachtas website, with links to debates on each bill

Ireland
 
Acts of the Oireachtas